= José Miguel Battle Sr. =

American mobster

- Born: September 14, 1929; Alto Songo, Cuba
- Died: August 4, 2007 (age 77); South Carolina, U.S.
- Occupations: Cuban mafia leader, policeman
- Children: 3
- Convictions: 20 years in prison
- Criminal charges: Murder, arson, drug trafficking, bookmaking, and numbers rackets

The Corporation/La Corporacion or Battle family
- Years active: 1960s - 2004
- Territory: Miami, New York City, Atlanta, Los Angeles, Washington, D.C., Peru, Panama
- Ethnicity: Cuban Americans, Cubans
- Membership: 2.500 members and associates
- Activities: drug trafficking, arms trafficking, gambling, prostitution, money laundering, corruption
- Allies: Cosa Nostra (US), Cali Cartel, Medellin Cartel, Alpha 66, Omega 7, Cuban Nationalist Association, Cuban Power, Contras
- Rivals: Martinez Familia Sangeros

Jose Miguel Battle Sr. (September 14, 1929 – August 4, 2007) was a policeman and Cuban exile who served in the unsuccessful Bay of Pigs Invasion to overthrow the communist Cuban government under Fidel Castro in 1961. He later became the nominal leader and founder of The Corporation, also known as the Cuban mafia, and he invested in the gambling industry in the United States and Peru. He was eventually convicted of racketeering and sentenced to 20 years in prison.

== Early life in Cuba ==
Battle was born on September 14, 1929, in Alto Songo, Cuba. His father was Jose Maria Battle Bestard and his mother, Angela Vargas Yzaguirre. He had five brothers: Gustavo, Pedro, Sergio, Hiram and Aldo. He was educated in Santiago de Cuba.

Battle began his career as a policeman in Santiago de Cuba in 1949, and he was transferred to Havana in the early 1950s. He had been a vice cop, handling cases related to illegal gambling, alcohol, drugs and racketeering and acted as a go-between for the Mafia, as a police sergeant delivering cash bribes from the criminal enterprises of Meyer Lansky to President Fulgencio Batista and his government. He got to know Martin Fox, owner of the Tropicana Club. Fox made monthly payments of 5,000 pesos to the chief of police José Salas Cafiizares, sometimes delivered by Battle himself. He also introduced Battle to Santo Trafficante Jr., boss of the Trafficante crime family in Florida. A connection that would later prove beneficial when Battle moved to the U.S.

He became a Freemason in Cuba. He emigrated to the United States in December 1959.

== Bay of Pigs Invasion ==
Battle assisted the Central Intelligence Agency in the early 1960s in training Cuban exiles and commanded one of the landing craft during the Bay of Pigs Invasion at Playa Girón in April 1961. Battle also served as a soldier in the ground assault. The invasion result was disastrous after President John F. Kennedy aborted American air support just five minutes before the armed Cubans reached Cuban soil. Jose, along with the other surviving expatriate soldiers, was captured after three days of arduous battle and imprisoned for nearly two years in a Cuban prison. Later he would contribute financially to the anti-Castro paramilitary organization Alpha 66 and the efforts of Luis Posada Carriles.

== Career ==
As compensation for his service in the Bay of Pigs Invasion, Battle was given an officer’s commission in the United States Army; he held the rank of second lieutenant in the infantry. He did not earn high enough evaluations to merit promotion to first lieutenant and left the Army after a year. After being released from what many saw as the result of a betrayal from JFK, Battle settled in Union City, New Jersey, and began leading of a family of Cuban-American criminals involved in organized crime activities from loansharking and gambling to drug trafficking and murder. He allegedly established good working relationships with the Italian Mafia in the New York City area, but at other times the corporation had violent turf wars with various Italian mafia families. He became wealthy from an illegal lottery racket known as bolita (little ball), which was popular among expatriate Italians, Cubans and Puerto Ricans. It is estimated that his network earned up to $45 million a year in the 1970s from bolita in New Jersey, New York, and Florida. Battles' reputation was such that he was known among the Cuban American community in Miami as El Padrino, or the Godfather. Battle leveraged the acquaintance he had with felllow bolita operator Florida boss Santo Trafficante Jr. back from his days in Cuba. At one point his brother Gustavo met with Trafficante on a semiregular basis in restaurants at Dade County. Trafficante set up meetings with various mobsters he knew in New Jersey and New York, introducing Battle to Sam DeCavalcante, Tony Salerno and representatives of the Bonanno crime family.

Battle was convicted in 1977 and sentenced to 30 years in prison in connection with the death of Ernesto “Ernestico” Torres, an alleged hitman for Battle's organization. An appeals court overturned the conviction, but Battle later pleaded guilty to murder conspiracy in exchange for a sentence of time served – two years.

By the 1980s Battle had built up an empire of crime and began investing heavily in legitimate businesses in the New York area. In Spanish Harlem, he had the Torres brothers Pancho, Enrique, and Henry who operated the numbers and Bolita for him in the uptown part of the city. The Torres brothers had a family affair using Pancho Torres' son in law Jose Castro and also his son Kiko Jr. to run the Bolita operation throughout the bodegas in the Harlem and South Bronx sections of the city.

In the late 1980s, President Ronald Reagan's Select Committee on Organized Crime investigated the Corporation and estimated its membership, direct or loosely associated, at 2,500 members. Soon afterwards, Battle expanded to Miami, Florida, where there was a large population of Cuban immigrants and operated his East Coast empire from the Little Havana area of the city. In 1987 Battle was listed as one of Dade County's wealthiest men with a net worth of $175 million.

In the early 1990s Battle Sr. fled to Lima, Peru, where he opened a casino in the Hotel Crillón. He eventually moved back to his $1.5 million Florida ranch, El Zapotal, in Homestead, Florida, south of Miami. The corporation was making hundreds of millions of dollars from gambling, racketeering, illegal lottery, and loan sharking, and operated in the US, Central and South America, the Caribbean, and Europe.

== Arrest, conviction and death ==
In 2004 Battle Sr, his son Jr., and 21 other key aid members and associates were indicted and charged with five murders, four arson attacks resulting in eight deaths, and more than $1.5 billion collected from drug trafficking, bookmaking, and numbers rackets. Of the 21, four were arrested in the New York and Union City, N.J. areas. One was in Puerto Rico and another in Spain; the rest were in the Miami area, including Battle's son. He was housed in the Metropolitan Correctional Center (MCC) in Miami on more charges of racketeering. Battle Jr and associate Julio Acuña attempted to appeal the decision but failed, with Battle Jr sentenced to more than 15 years in federal prison and ordered to forfeit $642 million and Acuña sentenced to life and a $1.4 billion judgment.

On May 6, 2006, Battle pleaded guilty to the racketeering charges due to his health. On January 15, 2007, he was sentenced to 20 years in prison. On August 6, 2007, he died from various ailments in a South Carolina medical facility while in Federal Custody awaiting transfer to another prison. He was 77.

== Popular culture ==
In April 2016, Paramount Pictures and The Picture Company announced plans to develop a biopic based on T.J. English's nonfiction book The Corporation with Benicio del Toro attached to play Battle Sr.

Battle is portrayed by Yul Vazquez in the third season of the TV series Godfather of Harlem, which premiered in 2023. He's depicted as a collaborator of the CIA in a plot to overthrow Fidel Castro even after the official end of Operation Mongoose.
