= Coordination of United Revolutionary Organizations =

Defunct anti-Castro militant group backed by the U.S. (1976–90s)

The Coordination of United Revolutionary Organizations (Spanish: Coordinación de Organizaciones Revolucionarias Unidas, CORU) was a militant group responsible for a number of terrorist activities directed at the Cuban government following the Cuban Revolution. It was founded by a group that included Orlando Bosch and Luis Posada Carriles, both of whom worked with the CIA at various times, and was composed chiefly of Cuban exiles opposed to the Castro government. It was formed in 1976 as an umbrella group for a number of anti-Castro militant groups. Its activities included a number of bombings and assassinations, including the killing of human-rights activist Orlando Letelier in Washington, D.C. in collaboration with Chilean secret police DINA, and the bombing of Cubana Flight 455 which killed 73 people.

== History ==
The FBI described CORU as "an anti-Castro terrorist umbrella organization." According to declassified CIA documents, the Coordination of United Revolutionary Organizations (CORU) was set up at a meeting in the small town of Bonao in the Dominican Republic in June 1976. The meeting was attended by a number of Cuban exile militant groups. The FBI later said that at the meeting, "these groups agreed to jointly participate in the planning, financing, and carrying out of terrorist operations and attacks against Cuba." Bosch, according to the document, was committed to violent acts against other countries he believed supported Cuba, including Colombia, Mexico and Panama. The groups included the terrorist organizations Alpha 66 and Omega 7 Orlando Bosch, who became leader of CORU, later stated that "Our war strategy was created there—everything. All the top leaders of the paramilitaries in Miami were there."

Carriles and Bosch were both present at the meeting in Bonao, at which CORU was formed, along with Gaspar Jiménez. A number of violent actions followed in the months after this meeting, for some of which CORU directly claimed responsibility. The group used the reputation they had gained from these attacks to generate support for a larger attack, including through a fundraising dinner held in Caracas, at which donors paid $1000 a plate. This larger plot turned out to be the bombing of Cubana Flight 455, which killed 73 people, and which remained the group's largest attack.

CORU continued to carry out violent attacks against the Cuban government until the 1990s. They also participated in attacks against democratic governments elsewhere; CORU members participated in Operation Condor, a covert campaign against left-wing movements, democratic movements, and human-rights campaigns in South America. Other members helped supply the Contras in Nicaragua, and possibly train them as well. Over the 1980s, the US government and Cuban Exile community shifted away from supporting armed exile groups in opposition to the Cuba state in favour of special interest political groups. Altogether, CORU was responsible for more than 50 bombings, in Miami, New York, Venezuela, Panama, Mexico and Argentina.

== Membership ==
Orlando Bosch, a prominent Cuban exile, was the head of CORU. Born in Cuba, Bosch met Fidel Castro while at the University of Havana, and was a member of some groups that took part in the Cuban Revolution, before being forced to flee to Miami. Later, he became disillusioned with the movement, and tried to organize a failed coup against Castro in 1960. He was a CIA operative at various points in the 1960s, before being arrested in 1968 for attacking a Polish freighter. After serving four years in prison, he went to Venezuela where he was arrested and jailed by Venezuelan authorities for blowing up Cuban and Panamanian buildings in Caracas. He moved to Curaçao soon after, where he claimed to have continued his activities against the Cuban government, including a series of bombings against Cuban consulates as part of a group called "Accion Cuba."

Another prominent member of CORU was Luis Posada Carriles. Born in Cuba, Carriles emigrated to Miami in 1961, and quickly got involved with anti-Castro activities. He was trained to be a part of the Bay of Pigs Invasion by the CIA, but did not take part in the actual event. He was recruited by the CIA as a "Maritime Training Branch" instructor in 1965. He was also expected to provide information on his fellow Cuban exiles. He spent the next several years working on several CIA projects, including a plot to blow up a Soviet and a Cuban ship in Mexico.

Other members of CORU included the brothers Guillermo Novo and Ignacio Novo, who unsuccessfully attempted to assassinate Che Guevara at the United Nations in 1964. Novo participated in the assassination of Orlando Letelier in 1976. Julio Labatut was a professional florist who was also an important member of CORU. Labatut had close ties to the Puerto Rican police. In an interview in 2001, he was asked if he had ordered the assassination of Carlos Muñiz Varela, a Cuban exile who worked as a travel agent. In response, he said "Don't call it an assassination, it was an execution and it should have been carried out before he was born." Perez Franco, who later became the president of Brigade 2506, another anti-Castro organization, was also a founding member of CORU, along with Lopez Estrada, who became its military chief.

== Terrorist activities ==
- A month after its founding meeting, CORU members attempted to kidnap the Cuban ambassador to Mexico; one of his aides was shot and killed.
- On 17 July 1976, the Cuban embassy in Bogota, Colombia, was attacked with machine guns. The attack has been attributed to CORU by historians.
- On 9 August 1976, two security agents at the Cuban consulate in Buenos Aires were kidnapped. CORU later claimed credit.
- On 1 September 1976, the Guyanese embassy in Port of Spain was destroyed by a bomb: the attack was later attributed to CORU.
- On 21 September, CORU members and the Chilean Secret police (DINA) set off a car bomb in Washington, D.C., which killed Orlando Letelier, who had previously been the Chilean ambassador, and was a human rights campaigner at the time. The bomb also killed his assistant, Ronni Karpen Moffit. Guillermo Novo was later convicted for involvement in this bombing, although he was acquitted on appeal.
- On 6 October 1976, Cubana Flight 455 was bombed in midair, killing all 73 passengers and crew on board. It was one of the worst incidents of aviation terrorism in the Western Hemisphere prior to the 9/11 attacks. An FBI document dated October 21, 1976, transmits information from a source who has spoken with a member of CORU named Secundino Carrera who admitted "that CORU was responsible for the bombing of the Cubana Airlines DC-8 on October 6, 1976." Carrera justifies the bombing as an act of war. The memo indicates that the bombing has caused some dissension in CORU over its tactics, but that the organization headed by Bosch is planning to sell bonds to finance future operations. A declassified CIA document from 1976 stated that Posada Carriles had spoken of plans to bomb Cubana Flight 455 a few days before the bombing took place. An FBI document from 1976 stated that several sources within CORU, including Secundino Carrera, had admitted to the bombing. CORU is widely seen as being responsible for the bombing.
- On 4 January 1979, 26 July 1979, and 18 January 1980, CORU organized three bomb attacks on a Puerto Rican travel agency named Viajes Varadero. The agency was named for a beach in Cuba, and its chief purpose was to facilitate the travel of Cuban exiles to their home country, both for business and for pleasure. The agency was thus seen as a threat by right-wing Cuban exiles, as it facilitated dialogue with the Cuban government.
- On 28 April 1979, Carlos Muñiz Varela, the owner of Viajes Varadero and a middle-class Cuban exile living in Puerto Rico, was murdered by gunshot. Academic José Quiroga states that CORU is suspected of involvement in the murder: however, the American FBI, which has a file on the assassination, was ordered in 1979 not to release any information tying CORU to the killing of Muñiz Varela. Soon afterwards, Omega 7 took responsibility for the act.

== Arrests and trials ==
Carriles and Bosch were linked to the bombing of the Cubana flight soon after it occurred, partly because Hernán Ricardo Lozano and Freddy Lugo, the men who placed the bombs, were employees of Carriles at the time. The four were arrested in Caracas, and tried before a military court, which acquitted them. However, a higher military tribunal annulled the verdict, and ordered a new trial, this time in a civilian court. This trial did not have the time to occur before Carriles escaped prison in 1985. Bosch was released two years later.

In 2000, Carriles was arrested again, for planning to assassinate Fidel Castro while the latter was visiting Panama City. He was convicted in Panama and sentenced to eight years in prison, but was pardoned and allowed to go free by the Panamanian president after serving one year.

Guillermo Novo was convicted for his involvement in the bombing that killed Orlando Letelier, although he was acquitted on appeal. He nonetheless served four years in prison for lying to the grand jury that was investigating the case. At the time that he was held in Caracas for the Cubana flight bombing, Bosch was also wanted by US authorities for his role in the Letelier killing. FBI agents unsuccessfully attempted to interview him in Caracas.

== Support in the United States ==
Throughout the existence of CORU, the militant Cuban exiles, such as Bosch and Carriles received financial and logistical support from wealthy Cuban exiles living in Miami and elsewhere in the United States. A Cuban exile group known as the "Guides" lobbied the President of Panama to release Carriles and his colleagues after they were arrested in that country in 2000. These Cuban exiles were also able to influence US policy. US federal judge Kathleen Cardone once stated that government prosecutors bungled their case against Carriles; on another occasion, a case against him was dismissed on a technicality.

Both Orlando Bosch and Posada Carriles worked for the US Central Intelligence Agency at various points in time. Bosch was in contact with the CIA in 1962 and 1963, as the agency itself admitted, as recorded in the National Security Archive. Posada Carriles was trained by the CIA for the Bay of Pigs invasion in 1961, and subsequently recruited as a Maritime Training Branch Instructor. The agency severed his contract in 1967, but he began working for the CIA again in the 1980s, this time in Nicaragua, where he supplied the Contra rebels with arms.

After Posada Carriles escaped from a Venezuelan prison in 1985, he was sheltered for a while by Félix Rodríguez, a CIA operative who, at the time, was working on a secret White House operation in El Salvador to airlift weapons to the Contra rebels in Nicaragua. Rodriguez was a significant figure in the Iran-Contra Scandal, and had close ties to then-US Vice-president George H. W. Bush.

Much of the funding that the Cuban exile militants originally received came from other exiles in Miami, including from Jorge Mas Canosa, who had participated in the CIA organized Bay of Pigs invasion. Mas Canosa also gave money to politicians in Florida, and eventually to politicians at the national level, who would support his anti-Castro agenda. In 1982, Mas Canosa founded the Cuban American National Foundation (CANF), which donated money to a number of politicians, and in return influenced their policy towards Cuba. In 1987, Orlando Bosch was arrested for illegally entering the US, and was to be deported. However, upon the direct intervention of Jeb Bush, he was granted permission to stay by the administration of George H. W. Bush. This was granted despite the Justice Department stating that Bosch had been "resolute and unwavering in his advocacy of terrorist violence," and should not therefore be allowed to remain in the US. Similarly, after Posada Carriles came to the US in 2004, the administration of George W. Bush declined to deport him to Venezuela to be tried.

Orlando Bosch was also pardoned for his crimes, by the administration of George H. W. Bush. On 16 February 1988 Bosch flew to Miami, despite not having a visa and having previously violated parole in the US by leaving the country. He was detained, and the US justice department recommended deporting him. His release became a political issue, with Ileana Ros-Lehtinen making his release a campaign position for her congressional campaign. After a personal intervention from Jeb Bush, his father overturned the recommendation of the Justice Department, and allowed his release. Two years later, he was given US residency. In 2001, two Cuban exiles who had been imprisoned for playing a part in Letelier's murder were freed.

== See also ==
- Cuban Power
- United States and state-sponsored terrorism
