= Marita Lorenz =

German spy and lover of Fidel Castro (1939–2019)

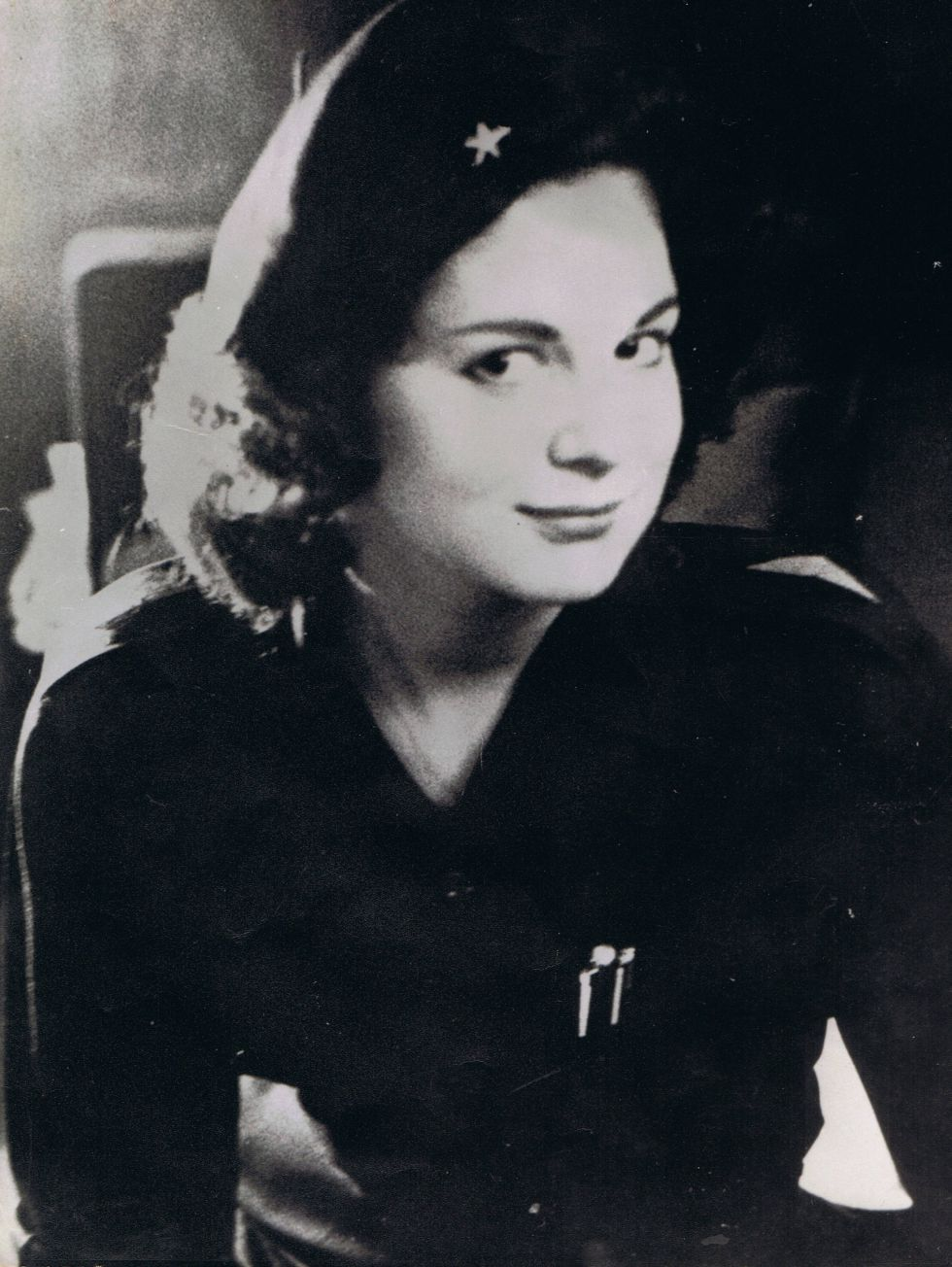
- Born: 18 August 1939; Bremen, Germany
- Died: 31 August 2019 (aged 80); Oberhausen, Germany

Ilona Marita Lorenz (18 August 1939 – 31 August 2019) was a German woman who had an affair with Fidel Castro in 1959 and in January 1960 was involved in an assassination attempt by the CIA on Castro's life.

In the 1970s and 1980s, she testified about the John F. Kennedy assassination, stating that she was involved with a group of anti-Cuban militants, including Frank Sturgis and E. Howard Hunt of CIA and Watergate infamy, shortly before the assassination.

== Early life ==
She was born Ilona Marita Lorenz in Bremen, the daughter of Alice June (née Lofland) and Heinrich Lorenz. She had a sister, Valerie, and two brothers, Joachim and Manfred "Philip". Her father, a wealthy German navy captain, became commander of a fleet of U-boats when Germany invaded Poland two weeks after Marita was born and was subsequently taken prisoner after his ship was captured; he was interned in a POW camp in England. Her mother, who was born in Delaware, was an actress and dancer who performed under the stage name June Paget. Earlier in the war she had been recruited for the French underground by British intelligence after she aided in the rescue of a French soldier and British pilot. Accused of helping forced laborers in Bremen escape, Marita and her mother were incarcerated in the Bergen-Belsen concentration camp in 1944.

After liberation by the allies, the Lorenz family moved to Bremerhaven. Alice began working for U.S. Army intelligence, and then the OSS, the U.S. wartime foreign intelligence agency predating the CIA.

When Marita was seven years old, she was raped by an American soldier, and testified against him in the trial that followed. Journalist Ann Louise Bardach wrote that "[m]any close to Lorenz say" these events "set in motion a lifelong pattern of violence and revenge in her relationships with men."

The Lorenz family moved to the United States in 1950, and Heinrich began work as captain of various luxury ocean liners. During this time, Alice's work in the intelligence community deepened, working alternatively with both U.S. Army intelligence and the Pentagon. Marita's sister Valerie described her mother's work: "I was never sure who [she] was working for, except I knew she worked in intelligence with high security clearance. She didn’t confide in me, but she was very close with Marita."

== Castro and Pérez Jiménez ==
In February 1959, weeks after the conclusion of the Cuban Revolution, Lorenz arrived in Havana with her father on board the MS Berlin. Fidel Castro and his men visited the ship and Castro took a liking to Lorenz. After dinner, the Berlin set sail for New York. Lorenz disembarked in Manhattan, where she would be living with her brother Joachim, a student at Columbia University. A few days after she arrived, Castro called Lorenz—she had given him Joachim's home number on a matchbox before parting ways—and said he was sending a plane to fly her back to Cuba. A jeep picked Lorenz up at the other end and drove her to the Havana Hilton, which Castro had repurposed as his base of operations. She claims then to have lived with Castro for several months, engaging in a sexual relationship.

Lorenz claimed in her memoir to have been impregnated by Castro. According to Lorenz in October 1959, when she was six months pregnant, she was given a laced drink in her hotel suite before being taken to an unknown location where an abortion was performed against her wishes. However Castro's long-time assistant Jesús Yáñez Pelletier disputes this and insisted that Lorenz had the abortion against Castro's own wishes.

She left the island and joined anti-Castro activists in Florida. Her later testimony named Francisco Fiorini as the CIA agent who recruited her to assassinate Castro, and that this was an alias for Frank Fiorini Sturgis. She received poison pills that she was to put in Castro's food. Back in Cuba in 1960, she did not deliver the pills but told Castro about the plot, claiming that she still loved him. She left the island and visited Castro one last time in 1981. She spent 10 days in Cuba in 1988.

According to Lorenz, in March 1961 she met deposed Venezuelan dictator Marcos Pérez Jiménez, introduced to her as "General Diaz", at a residence in Miami Beach, Florida while working as a courier for the International Anti-Communist Brigade. She said she was to collect a $200,000 contribution from Pérez Jiménez for her group. Lorenz said: "He chased me around for six weeks."

Lorenz claimed that Castro and Pérez Jiménez each fathered a child with her.

In August 1963, a paternity suit Lorenz filed against Pérez Jiménez briefly held up his extradition to Venezuela. She claimed to have been with Frank Sturgis at a meeting with the CIA head in Miami which also included E. Howard Hunt, which Frank stated was for planning right before the JFK assassination.

== JFK conspiracy allegations ==
In 1977, Lorenz told Paul Meskil of the New York Daily News that she met Lee Harvey Oswald in the fall of 1963 at an Operation 40 safe house in the Little Havana section of Miami. According to Lorenz, she met him again before the Kennedy assassination in 1963 in the house of Orlando Bosch, with Frank Sturgis, Pedro Luis Díaz Lanz, and two other Cubans present. She said the men studied Dallas street maps and that she suspected that they were planning on raiding an arsenal. Lorenz stated that she joined the men traveling to Dallas in two cars and carrying "rifles and scopes", but flew back to Miami the day after they arrived. In response to her allegations, Sturgis said he did not recall ever meeting Oswald and reiterated his previous denials of being involved in a conspiracy to kill Kennedy.

On October 31, 1977, Sturgis was arrested in Lorenz's apartment after Lorenz told police that Sturgis threatened her in an attempt to force her to change her testimony to federal investigators. In an interview with Steve Dunleavy of the New York Post shortly after he posted bail, Sturgis said that he believed communist agents had pressured Lorenz into making the accusations against him. Later that week in Manhattan Criminal Court, charges against Sturgis were dropped after the prosecutor told the judge that his office found no evidence of coercion or harassment.

Lorenz testified about this Kennedy assassination plot before the House Select Committee on Assassinations (HSCA). Her testimony was investigated by the political committee and said to be unreliable.

In February 1985, attorney Mark Lane read a deposition that Lorenz provided in E. Howard Hunt's libel suit against the Liberty Lobby's tabloid, The Spotlight. Lorenz lived in New York City at the time, however, Lane read the deposition in court stating that Lorenz was "afraid to come to Miami". The deposition reiterated allegations similar to those she provided to the HSCA. Lorenz said she met Oswald in Miami in the early 1960s, and that in November 1963 Sturgis asked her to come to Dallas with him and Oswald to act as a decoy. Her statement said that she, Oswald, and seven anti-Castro Cubans transported weapons to Dallas in two cars shortly before 22 November 1963. Lorenz claimed that Hunt came to their Dallas motel room and provided Sturgis with an envelope filled with cash. According to one account, this testimony became the "centerpiece" for Lane's 1991 book Plausible Denial.

Lorenz was interviewed for the 1988 Jack Anderson documentary American Expose: Who Killed JFK?. In 1993, Lorenz was interviewed by Vanity Fair writer Ann Louise Bardach who described her as "a patron saint of conspiracy buffs". Bardach wrote, "while at least half of what she says is readily documented by the accounts of others and by F.B.I. memorandums, the other half lacks any corroboration, and at times even flies in the face of existing evidence."

== Work for the FBI ==
In 1970, she married the manager of an apartment building in New York. The two worked for the FBI spying on Eastern Bloc UN diplomats living in the building.

== Books and films ==
With Ted Schwarz, Lorenz's first autobiography, Marita: One Woman's Extraordinary Tale of Love and Espionage from Castro to Kennedy, was published in 1993 by Thunder's Mouth Press. Kirkus Reviews described the book as "the wild—if nearly incredible—adventures of a new Jane Bond". Publishers Weekly wrote: "Like other sensational conspiracy stories, this one presses the limits of credibility, but its very outrageousness gives it weight." Her second autobiography Lieber Fidel – Mein Leben, meine Liebe, mein Verrat (ISBN 3471780793) appeared in 2001.

Lorenz's story was the inspiration for Jack Bender's 1999 TV film My Little Assassin. Gabrielle Anwar portrayed Lorenz in the film and her mother Alice was portrayed by Jill Clayburgh. She is also the subject of a 2000 German documentary film Lieber Fidel – Maritas Geschichte ("Dear Fidel – Marita's Story").

In 2016, it was reported that she would be played by Jennifer Lawrence in the upcoming biographical film Marita, which is based on Lorenz's memoir, Marita: The Spy Who Loved Castro. As of 2022, the film is still listed as 'in development'.

== Personal life ==
Lorenz lived in Baltimore, Maryland.

Monica Mercedes Pérez Jiménez, the daughter she had with Marcos Pérez Jiménez (former President of Venezuela), was married to one of the sons of Orlando Letelier.
