= Cubana de Aviación Flight 455 =

1976 airliner bombing of a Cubana passenger flight

Cubana Flight 455
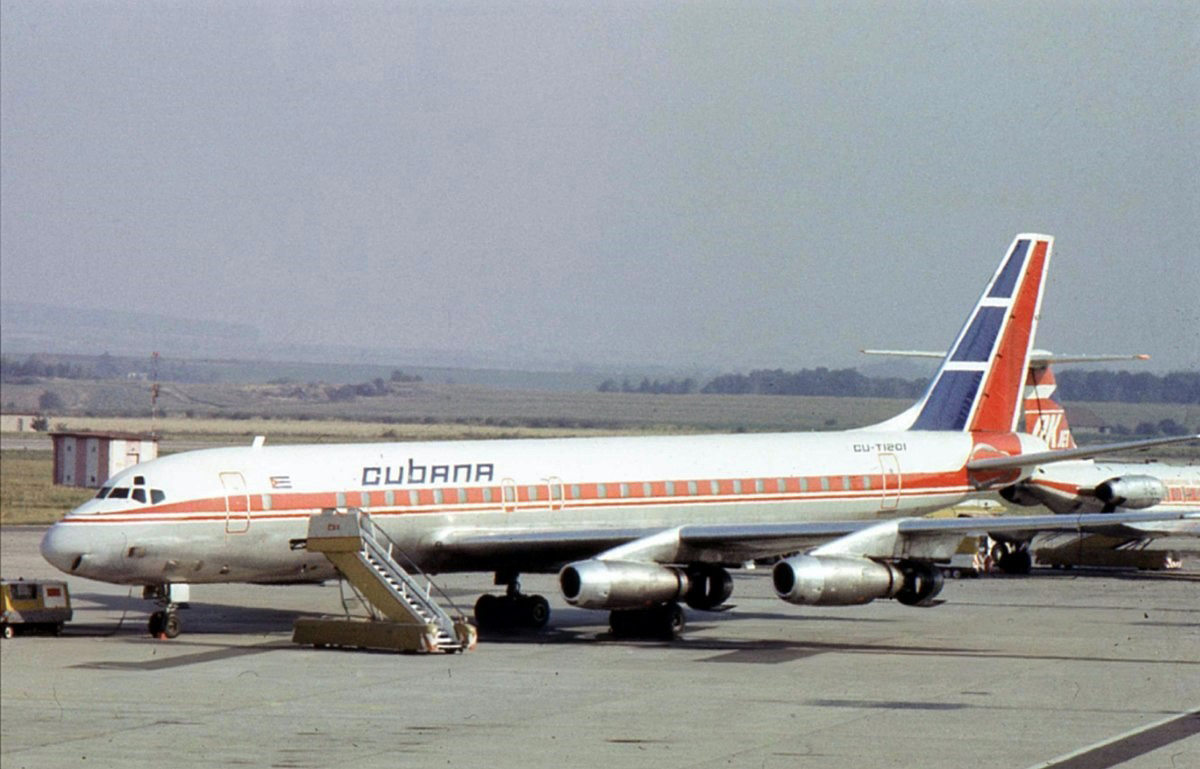
- CU-T1201, the aircraft involved in the incident, pictured in April 1976

Bombing
- Date: 6 October 1976
- Summary: Terrorist bombing
- Site: 8 km (5.0 mi; 4.3 nmi) west of Bridgetown, Barbados; 13°07′48″N 59°43′30″W

Aircraft
- Aircraft type: Douglas DC-8-40
- Operator: Cubana de Aviación
- IATA flight No.: CU455
- ICAO flight No.: CUB455
- Call sign: CUBANA 455
- Registration: CU-T1201
- Flight origin: Timehri International Airport, Georgetown, Guyana
- 1st stopover: Piarco International Airport, Trinidad, Trinidad and Tobago
- 2nd stopover: Seawell Airport, Bridgetown, Barbados
- Last stopover: Palisadoes Airport, Kingston, Jamaica
- Destination: José Martí International Airport, Havana, Cuba
- Occupants: 73
- Passengers: 48
- Crew: 25
- Fatalities: 73
- Survivors: 0

Cubana de Aviación Flight 455 was an international Cuban flight from Barbados to Jamaica that was brought down on 6 October 1976 by a terrorist bomb attack. All 73 people on board the Douglas DC-8 aircraft were killed after two time bombs went off and the plane crashed into the sea. The crash killed every member of the Cuban national fencing team.

Several CIA-linked anti-Castro Cuban exiles, among them Rafael De Jesus Gutierrez, a Cuban intelligence officer of the Batista regime turned CIA spy after the Cuban revolution, were implicated by the evidence. Political complications quickly arose when Cuba accused the US government of being an accomplice to the attack. CIA documents released in 2005 do indicate that the agency "had concrete advance intelligence, as early as June 1976, on plans by Cuban exile terrorist groups to bomb a Cubana airliner." Former CIA operative and anti-Castro militant Luis Posada Carriles denied involvement but provides many details of the incident in his book Caminos del Guerrero (Ways of the Warrior). The Coordination of United Revolutionary Organizations, of which Carriles was a founder, is widely seen as responsible for the bombing.

Four men were arrested in connection with the bombing, and a trial was held in Venezuela. Freddy Lugo and Hernán Ricardo Lozano were each sentenced to 20-year prison terms. Orlando Bosch was acquitted and later moved to Miami, Florida, where he lived until his death on 27 April 2011. Luis Posada Carriles was held for eight years while awaiting a final sentence but eventually fled. He later entered the United States, where he was held on charges of entering the country illegally, but was released on 19 April 2007.

== Background ==
On 11 June 1976, Coordination of United Revolutionary Organizations (CORU) was founded in the Dominican Republic by Cuban exiles. CORU united five anti-Castro Cuban exile groups, including Alpha 66 and Omega 7. For three months prior to the bombing of Flight 455, CORU waged a campaign of violence against several Caribbean countries which had established links with Cuba.

In July 1976, the same flight was targeted in Jamaica by a suitcase bomb which exploded shortly before being loaded onto the plane. Other bombings in the summer included a number of offices of airlines carrying out business with Cuba, including the offices of the BWIA West Indies Airways in Barbados; of Air Panama in Colombia; and of Iberia and Nanaco Line in Costa Rica.

Other attacks included the murder of a Cuban official in Mexico and two more Cuban officials in Argentina; the September assassination of Orlando Letelier in Washington, D.C.; and "a mysterious fire in Guyana [which] destroyed a large quantity of Cuban-supplied fishing equipment."

== Preparations ==
On 5 October 1976, Lugo and Hernán Ricardo Lozano left Caracas for Trinidad, arriving at 1 a.m. The following day, they sought to board Cubana de Aviación flight number CU-455, which was scheduled to fly from Guyana to Havana, Cuba, via Trinidad, Barbados, and Kingston, after rejecting an offer of an earlier flight with British West Indies Airways (BWIA). With a member of the Cuban fencing team waiting for the Cubana flight assisting with interpretation, the pair were able to insist on boarding the later Cubana flight. The pair left the flight at Barbados, and later returned to Trinidad.

== Crash ==
Eleven minutes after takeoff from Barbados' Seawell Airport (now Grantley Adams International Airport) and at an altitude of 18,000 feet (5,500 m), two bombs exploded on board. One was located in the aircraft's rear lavatory, and another in the midsection of the passenger cabin. The former ultimately destroyed the aircraft's control cables, while the latter blasted a hole in the aircraft and started a fire.

The plane went into a rapid descent, while the pilots tried unsuccessfully to return the plane to Seawell Airport. The captain, Wilfredo Pérez Pérez, radioed to the control tower: "We have an explosion aboard – we are descending immediately! ... We have fire on board! We are requesting immediate landing! We have a total emergency!" Realizing a successful landing was no longer possible, it appears that the pilot turned the craft away from the beach and towards the Caribbean Sea off Porters, St James, potentially saving the lives of many tourists. The crash occurred about 8 kilometres (5.0 mi) off the coast.

All 48 passengers and 25 crew aboard the plane died: the victims comprised 57 Cubans, eleven Guyanese, and five North Koreans. Among the dead were all 24 members of the 1975 national Cuban fencing team, which had just won every gold medal in the Central American and Caribbean Championships; many were teenagers. Several officials of the Cuban government were also aboard the plane: Manuel Permuy Hernández, director of the National Institute of Sports (INDER); Jorge de la Nuez Suárez, secretary for the shrimp fleet; Alfonso González, National Commissioner of Firearm Sports; and Domingo Chacón Coello, an agent from the Interior Ministry. The eleven Guyanese passengers included five travelling to Cuba to study medicine, and the young wife of a Guyanese diplomat. The five North Koreans were government officials and a cameraman.

== Judicial proceedings ==
=== Arrests ===
Hours after the explosions, Trinidadian authorities arrested Freddy Lugo and Hernan Ricardo Lozano, two Venezuelan men who had boarded the plane in Trinidad and checked their baggage to Cuba, but who had exited the plane in Barbados and flown separately to Trinidad. Lozano had been traveling with a false identity under the name of José Vázquez García.

Lugo and Lozano confessed, and declared they were acting under the orders of Luis Posada Carriles, a CIA operative. Their testimony, along with other evidence, implicated Posada and fellow CIA operative Orlando Bosch, an anti-Castro Cuban living in Venezuela.

On 14 October 1976, Posada and Bosch were arrested in Caracas, Venezuela, and the offices of the Commercial and Industrial Investigations C.A. (Investigaciones Comerciales e Industriales, ICICA), a private investigator’s company owned by Posada, were raided. Weapons, explosives and a radio transmitter were found. Lozano was an employee of ICICA at the time of the attack, while Lugo worked as a photographer for the Ministry of Mines and Hydrocarbons.

On 20 October, authorities of Trinidad, Cuba, Barbados, Guyana and Venezuela held a meeting in Port of Spain, during which it was decided to hold the trial in Caracas, Venezuela, since the four accused were citizens of that country. Shortly after, Lugo and Lozano were deported to Venezuela.

=== Military trial ===
On 25 August 1977, Judge Delia Estava Moreno referred the case to a military tribunal, charging all four co-conspirators with treason.

In September 1980, a Venezuelan military judge acquitted all four men.

The prosecutor appealed, arguing that a military court was the wrong forum to try the case for two reasons: none of the men were military personnel in 1976, and the crime of qualified homicide or aggravated homicide cannot be tried by a military tribunal. The Military Court of Appeals agreed and surrendered jurisdiction, rendering the acquittal moot. The Judge ruled that the accused "are civilians and the crimes imputed to them are governed by the penal (and not the military) code ... Civilians and common law crimes are not subject to the dispositions of the Code of Military Justice."

=== Civilian trial ===
The four were then charged with aggravated homicide and treason before a civilian court.

On 8 August 1985, Venezuelan judge Alberto Perez Marcano of the 11th Penal Court convicted Lugo and Ricardo, sentencing them each to twenty years in prison. The judge reduced the penalty to its lowest limit "due to the extenuating circumstance of no prior criminal records." Orlando Bosch was acquitted, because the evidence gathered by the Barbados authorities during the investigation could not be used in the Venezuela trial, as it was presented too late and had not been translated into Spanish.

Posada fled from the San Juan de los Morros penitentiary on the eve of the pronouncement of his sentence. He had been confined there following two previous failed escape attempts. Allegations were made that Venezuelan authorities were bribed to help him escape. No verdict was entered against Posada because, according to the Venezuelan Penal Code, judicial proceedings cannot continue without the presence of the accused. The court issued an arrest warrant against him which lasted until his death.

=== Aftermath ===
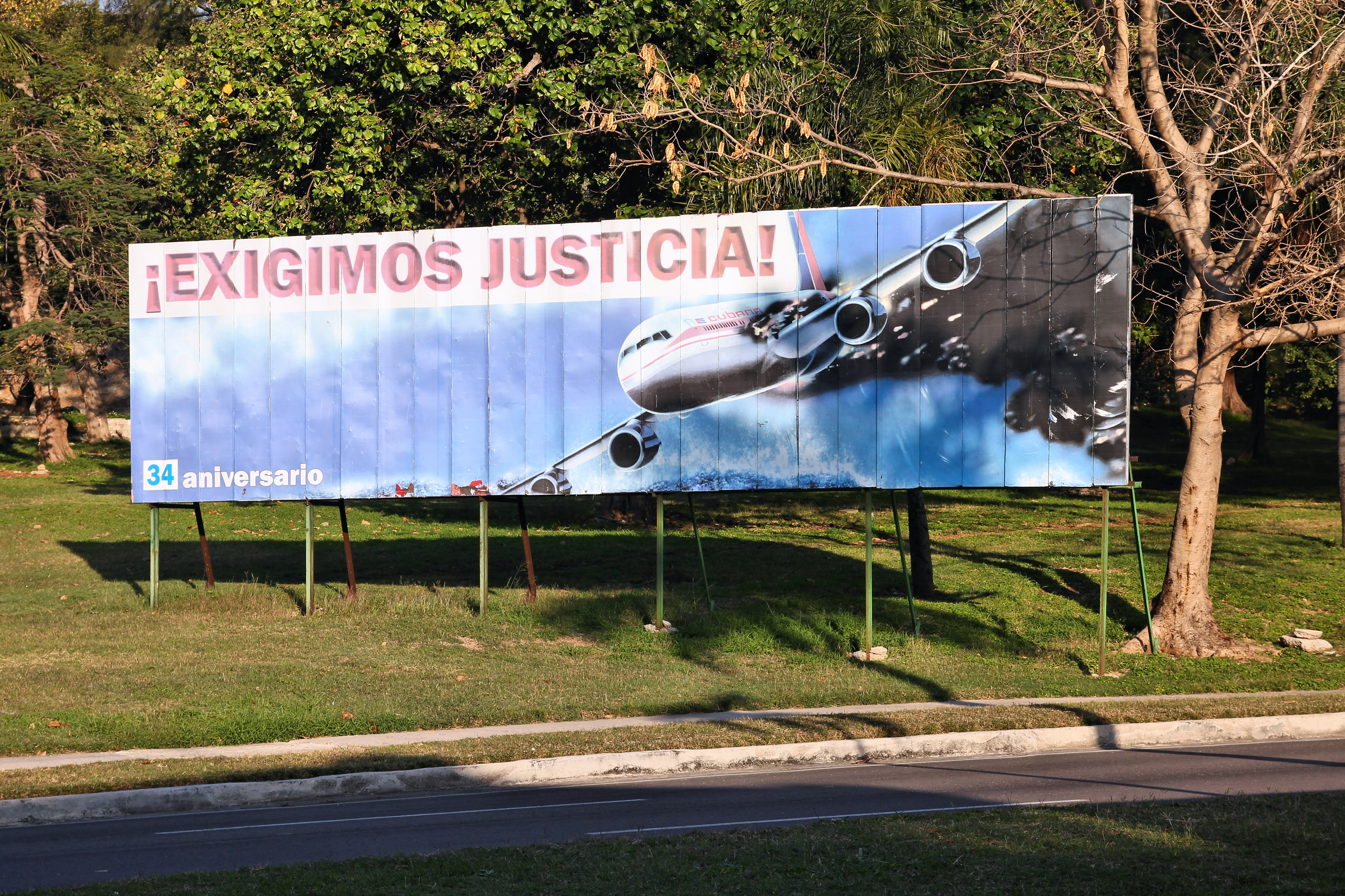
Billboard demanding justice for Cubana de Aviación Flight 455 in Havana (2011).

A different judge then ordered the case reviewed by a higher court. The Venezuelan government declined to appeal the case any further, and in November 1987 Bosch was freed. He had spent 11 years in jail despite having been acquitted twice. Lugo and Lozano were released in 1993 and continue to reside in Venezuela.

Posada then fled to Panama and to the United States. In April 2005, a new warrant for his arrest in connection with the bombing was issued in Venezuela by the government of Hugo Chávez. However, a U.S. immigration judge ruled that Posada should not be deported to Cuba or Venezuela because he could be subject to torture in those countries. In 2007, Congressman Bill Delahunt and Jose Pertierra, an immigration lawyer representing the government of Venezuela, argued that Posada could be deported on the grounds that the U.S. was making an exception for Posada. Because, they argued, the U.S. practices extraordinary rendition involving the seizure and transportation of suspected terrorists to Syria and Egypt, both of which practice torture, the U.S. could also deport Posada, a terrorist, to Cuba or Venezuela.

Freed from Venezuelan charges, Bosch went to the United States, assisted by US Ambassador to Venezuela Otto Reich; there, he was ultimately arrested for a parole violation. On 18 July 1990, Bosch was pardoned of all American charges by President George H. W. Bush at the request of his son Jeb Bush, who later became Governor of Florida; this pardon was despite objections by the President's own defense department that Bosch was one of the most deadly terrorists working "within the hemisphere." Although many countries sought Bosch's extradition, he remained free in the United States. The political pressure to grant Bosch a pardon was begun during the congressional campaign run by Ileana Ros-Lehtinen, herself a Cuban American, and overseen by her campaign manager Jeb Bush.

In 2005, Posada was held by U.S. authorities in Texas on the charge of illegal presence on national territory before the charges were dismissed on 8 May 2007. His release on bail on 19 April 2007, had elicited angry reactions from the Cuban and Venezuelan governments. The U.S. Justice Department had urged the court to keep him in jail because he was "an admitted mastermind of terrorist plots and attacks", a flight risk and a danger to the community.

On 28 September 2005, a U.S. immigration judge ruled that Posada could not be deported because he faced the threat of torture in Venezuela.

== FBI and CIA knowledge ==
"The U.S. authorities know that international terrorist Orlando Bosch Avila and his organization of which Luis Posada Carriles is a member hatched the plot to blow up this plane. This is not only backed up by investigations undertaken in Cuba. U.S. Associate Attorney General Joe Whitley, who analyzed hundreds of public documents and secret CIA and FBI files, concluded that the Coordination of United Revolutionary Organizations was responsible for the attack and the top leader of this terrorist group is Bosch."

— Jose Luis Mendez, author of several books on anti-Castro militants.

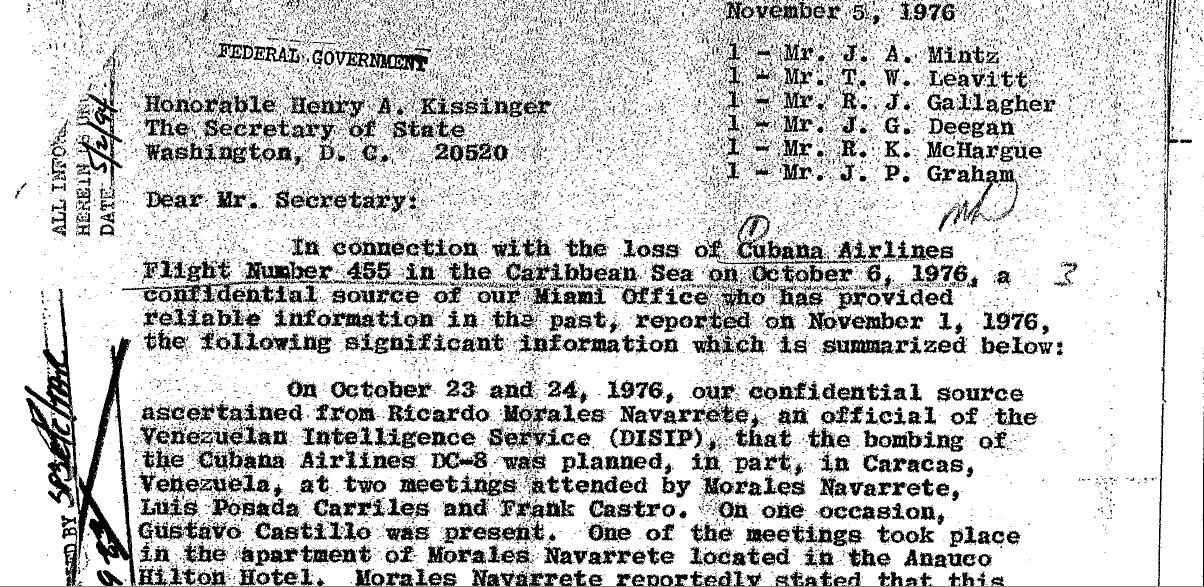
Declassified FBI report that reads: "Our confidential source ascertained ... that the bombing of the Cubana Airlines DC-8 was planned, in part, in Caracas, Venezuela, at two meetings attended by Morales Navarette, Luis Posada Carriles and Frank Castro"

Luis Posada Carriles, a Cuban-born naturalized Venezuelan, was the Director of Counterintelligence at Venezuela's FBI equivalent, the DISIP, from 1967 to 1974. A U.S. Government document released through FOIA also confirms Posada's status with the CIA: "Luis Posada, in whom CIA has an operational interest - Posada is receiving approximately $300 per month from CIA". Posada was heavily involved with right-wing anti-Castro groups, in particular the Cuban-American National Foundation (CANF) and the Coordinadora de Organizaciones Revolucionarias Unidas (Coordination of United Revolutionary Organizations - CORU), led at the time by Orlando Bosch.

According to documents, Posada stopped being a CIA asset in 1974, but there remained "occasional contact" until June 1976, a few months before the bombing. CIA had concrete advance intelligence, as early as June 1976, on possible plans by Cuban exile terrorist groups to bomb a Cubana airliner, and the FBI's attaché in Caracas had multiple contacts with one of the Venezuelans who placed the bomb on the plane, and provided him with a visa to the U.S. five days before the bombing, despite suspicions that he was engaged in terrorist activities at the direction of Luis Posada Carriles.

A declassified CIA document dated 12 October 1976, a few days after the bombing, quotes Posada as saying, a few days after a plate fund-raising meeting for CORU held around 15 September, "We are going to hit a Cuban airliner ... Orlando has the details" (Source Comment: The identities of "We" and "Orlando" were not known at the time.)

Our hope is that the US government will designate Luis Posada Carriles as a terrorist and hold him accountable for the pain, suffering and loss he has caused to us and so many other families.

— Roseanne Nenninger, whose 19-year-old brother, Raymond, was aboard Flight 455

A declassified FBI document dated 21 October 1976, quotes CORU member Secundino Carrera as stating that CORU "was responsible for the bombing of the Cubana Airlines DC-8 on 6 October 1976 ... this bombing and the resulting deaths were fully justified because CORU was at war with the Fidel Castro regime." Carrera also expressed his pleasure over the attention paid to the United States over the bombing, as it was taking attention off of himself and his associate.

On 3 May 2007, the National Security Archive, an independent research organization located at George Washington University, released documents linking Posada to the 1976 Cubana airline bombing and other terrorist attacks and plots, including those targeting a British West Indian Airways office in Barbados and the Guyanese embassy in Trinidad. Peter Kornbluh, director of the National Security Archive's Cuba Documentation Project, stated that these documents provide additional proof of Posada's involvement in violent efforts to undermine Castro's government.

== Memorials and legacy ==
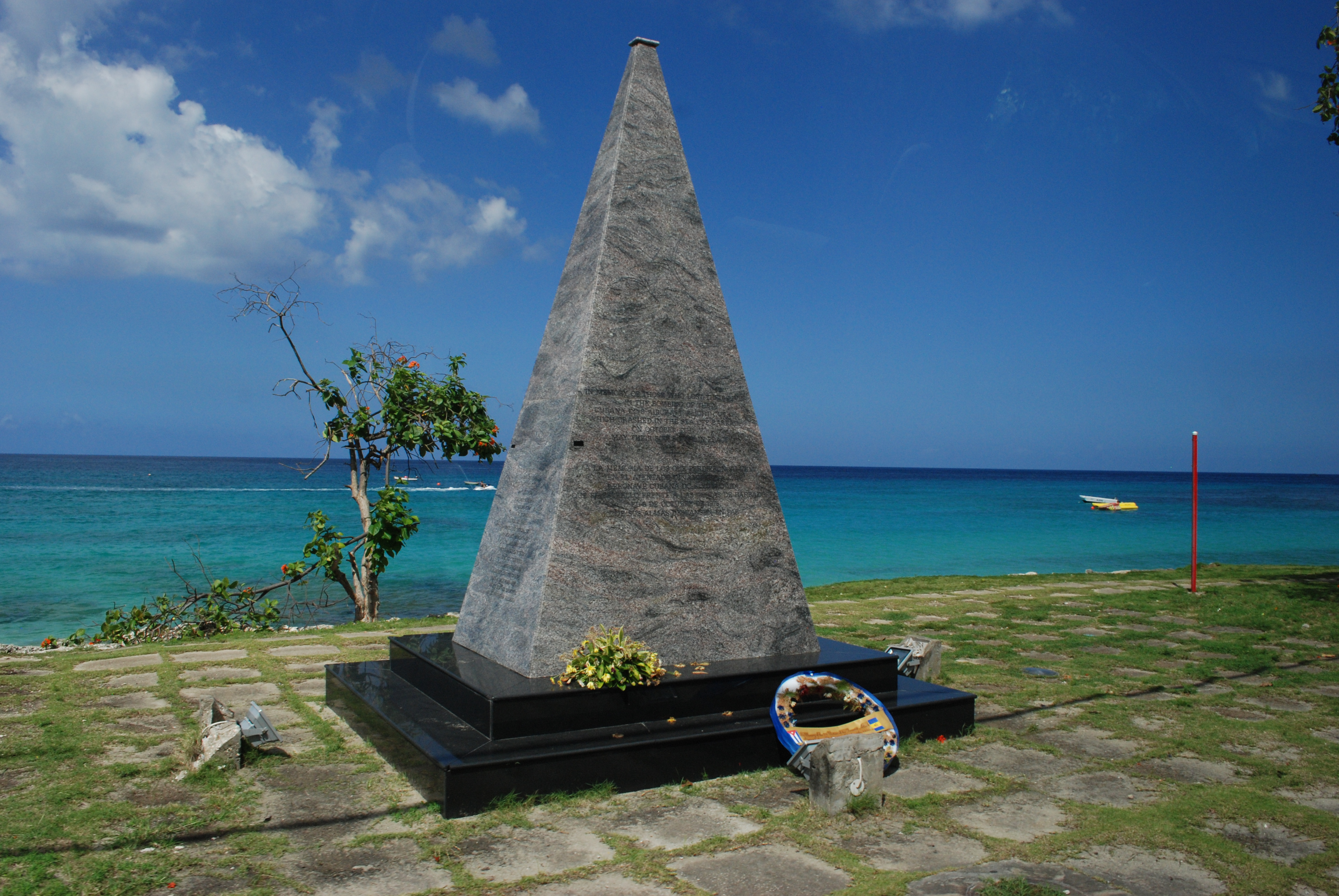
This memorial was erected in recognition of the 73 people who were killed in the crash of Cubana Flight 455 just off the coast of Bridgetown, Barbados, in early October 1976.

A monument was erected at Payne's Bay, Saint James, Barbados, to the memory of the people killed in the bombing. It was visited several times by Fidel Castro and other Cuban and Venezuelan officials, including a visit during the CARICOM meeting in December 2005, during which Cuban officials called for Posada "to be brought to justice so as to bring closure to this egregious incident that caused so much pain to the people of the region." In October 2012, an additional monument to the tragedy was unveiled in Guyana, South America at the Turkeyen campus of the University of Guyana.

There have also been proposals in the Caribbean region to have the United Nations pass a resolution to make the annual day of 6 October as "U.N. International Day Against Terrorism."

== Similar incidents ==
- Iran Air Flight 655, shot down by a missile fired from the USS Vincennes.
- Metrojet Flight 9268, terrorist bombing by the Islamic State's Sanai Branch.
- Pan Am Flight 103, bombing by Libyan intelligence agents.
- Air India Flight 182, in-flight terrorist bombing perpetrated by Babbar Khalsa.
- Itavia Flight 870, in-flight breakup incident; the cause of the breakup is a subject of widespread dispute and controversy.
- Avianca Flight 203, in-flight bombing ordered by the Medellín Cartel.

== See also ==
- Aviation safety
- Cubana de Aviación accidents and incidents
- Cuba–United States relations
- United States and state-sponsored terrorism
- List of accidents involving sports teams
- World Finance Corporation
