= Orlando Bosch =

Cuban exile militant (1926–2011)

- Bosch in 1965
- Born: Orlando Bosch Ávila; 18 August 1926; Potrerillo, Cuba
- Died: 27 April 2011 (aged 84); Miami, Florida, United States
- Education: University of Havana
- Known for: Militant activities

Orlando Bosch Ávila (18 August 1926 – 27 April 2011) was a Cuban exile militant, who headed the Coordination of United Revolutionary Organizations (CORU), described by the United States Federal Bureau of Investigation as a terrorist organization. Born in Cuba, Bosch attended medical school at the University of Havana, where he befriended Fidel Castro. He worked as a doctor in Santa Clara Province in the 1950s, but moved to Miami in 1960 after he stopped supporting the Cuban Revolution.

Between 1961 and 1968 Bosch was arrested several times in the United States for attacks directed at the Cuban government, and briefly collaborated with the Central Intelligence Agency. He was jailed in Florida in 1968 for a bazooka attack on a Polish freighter, but violated parole and fled to Venezuela in 1974 at the invitation of fellow terrorist exile militant Luis Posada Carriles. Arrested for a bombing, he was released in exchange for surrendering his munitions, and moved to Chile. The U.S. government considered him to have been involved in multiple bombings while there. In 1976 he was arrested for an assassination attempt in Costa Rica; the U.S. declined an extradition offer, and he was sent to the Dominican Republic.

Bosch founded CORU in 1976 along with Posada and other Cuban exiles. The group was responsible for a number of attacks in 1976, including the assassination of Orlando Letelier in Washington, D.C. as a part of Operation Condor. CORU is also considered to be responsible for the bombing of Cubana Flight 455, a Cuban civilian airliner, on 6 October 1976 in which all 73 people on board were killed. Bosch, Posada, and two others were arrested and tried for the bombing in Venezuela. Posada escaped from prison, while Bosch was acquitted by a Venezuelan military court in 1986. The other two men, both employees of Posada, were sentenced to twenty years in prison.

Upon his return to the U.S. in 1988, Bosch was arrested for parole violations. The Justice Department, which considered him a terrorist, sought to deport him. He was allowed to stay, and later granted residency, by U.S. President George H. W. Bush after a widespread lobbying campaign that included Congresswoman Ileana Ros-Lehtinen and the president's son Jeb Bush. In his later years Bosch raised money to support resistance to the Cuban government, and died in Miami aged 84. He remains a controversial figure, with former U.S. Attorney General Dick Thornburgh describing him as an "unreformed terrorist".

== Personal life ==
Orlando Bosch Ávila was born on 18 August 1926 in the village of Potrerillo, 240 kilometres (150 mi) east of Havana. His mother was a school teacher, and his father owned a restaurant. In 1946 Bosch enrolled in the University of Havana medical school, where he befriended the future Cuban leader Fidel Castro. Bosch was president of the medical school student body while Castro was head of the law school student body. Castro was only five days younger than Bosch. Bosch would later state that the two were close friends who frequently smoked cigars together. While they were students, both men worked against the government of Cuban dictator Fulgencio Batista. According to a classmate of his, Bosch's fiery temperament earned him the nickname "Piro", meaning pyromaniac.

After graduating, Bosch moved to Toledo, Ohio for a paediatric internship, beginning in 1952. He then returned to Cuba to work as a doctor in Santa Clara Province. His activities included vaccinating children against polio. He also covertly organized for Castro's guerilla war against the Batista government. In 1960, however, less than one-and-a-half years after Castro overthrew Batista, Bosch stopped supporting the Cuban Revolution, and moved to Miami with his wife Myriam, a fellow medical school graduate. They took their four children with them, and soon had another child. The couple divorced ten years later, when Bosch was in prison. Bosch began working for a hospital in Coral Gables, Florida, where he held the position of assistant director.

While in Chile in the early 1970s, Bosch met Adriana Delgado, whom he married in February 1975. Adriana, his second wife, was 20 years younger than him. In 1976, the couple had a daughter. Bosch would return to the United States in 1988, despite being wanted for parole violations, saying "I have a loving wife who resides in the United States and five American children with whom I want to share the last years of my life." He died in 2011 aged 84 in a hospital in the suburbs of Miami.

== Career ==
Bosch had left Cuba in July 1960 after helping to organize a failed anti-Castro rebellion in the Escambray Mountains, and continued participating in anti-Castro activities after moving to Miami. Bosch helped organize the Movimiento Insurreccional de Recuperacion Revolucionaria (Insurrectional Movement of Revolutionary Recovery, MIRR), which conducted attacks on factories and sugar mills in Cuba, and claimed to be responsible for 11 bombing attacks against government property. From January to November 1962, and again in November 1963, Bosch was in contact with the U.S. Central Intelligence Agency (CIA). On the first occasion, Bosch was intended to help plan infiltration efforts into Cuba, and obtained supplies and safe houses for the team; on the second, Bosch sought funding for airstrikes against Cuba, which the CIA refused. A CIA memorandum from 1976 described Bosch as "General Coordinator" of the MIRR at the time of his contact with the CIA. In 1963 Bosch published the pamphlet The Tragedy of Cuba, wherein he argued that President Kennedy had betrayed the exiles.

=== Arrests in Florida and Venezuela ===
You have to fight violence with violence. At times you cannot avoid hurting innocent people.

— Orlando Bosch, 1979 statement while jailed in Venezuela.

Bosch was soon fired from his job for keeping explosives on the hospital property, and was arrested several times for his involvement in a series of plots. The first of these was in 1964, when he was caught towing a radio-operated torpedo through rush-hour traffic. The next year, Bosch and five others were charged with smuggling bombs out of the U.S., after a raid by police on a house close to Orlando. In April 1966 a police roadblock found Bosch transporting bombs made with dynamite; he told them he was taking them to a "secret base where there was a boat we could use to bomb Castro." In December of the same year, he was charged with extortion. According to a report by the United States Department of Justice, Bosch was involved with 30 incidents of terrorism between 1960 and 1968.

Bosch was not convicted for his activities until 1968, when he launched an attack on a Polish freighter. Standing on a bridge over Biscayne Bay, he fired a shell at the ship from a 57 mm homemade bazooka. Bosch was also charged with sending telegrams to the governments of Britain and Mexico, threatening to destroy ships from those countries. During his defense, Bosch stated that he believed the ship was headed to Cuba. Bosch was sentenced to ten years in prison; delivering the judgement, the judge stated that Bosch had "long professed the use of violence to achieve his aims in flagrant disregard of the laws of the United States". In the trial, the government described Bosch as a member of the terrorist organization Cuban Power, that claimed responsibility for "dozens of bombings and assassination attempts". Eight others, all described as members of the same group, were also convicted. Among those testifying against Bosch was FBI informant Ricardo Morales.

Bosch served four years of his sentence before being released on parole in 1972. Claude Kirk, then the Governor of Florida, was among those who advocated for Bosch to receive early parole. In June 1974 he told The Miami News that he was the head of a group called Accion Cubana, and that the organization was responsible for a series of bomb attacks on Cuban consulates in Latin America since August 1973. On 12 April 1974, he violated parole and fled to Venezuela, shortly after he was served a subpoena in a case involving a murder. He had been invited to Venezuela by Luis Posada Carriles, another Cuban exile militant who was then serving as the head of DISIP, the Venezuelan intelligence service. The same year, Bosch detonated bombs at a cultural center and at the Panamanian embassy in Caracas, in both cases just before representatives of the Cuban government were supposed to be there. The date of the attack, 12 October, was Cuba's independence day. He was released in exchange for surrendering his arsenal, and was seen soon after in Curaçao, where he said to a newsman, also a Cuban exile: "We will invade the Cuban embassies and will murder the Cuban diplomats and will hijack the Cuban planes until Castro releases some of the political prisoners and begins to deal with us."

Bosch moved to the Chilean city of Santiago, where the government of Augusto Pinochet provided a safe haven to Bosch and other anti-communists. According to a memo sent to the U.S. by the Chilean government, he arrived on 3 December 1974, going by the alias Pedro Pena. He stayed in a military safe house, and "lived quietly as an artist". While the Cuban government stated that Bosch did not conduct anti-Castro activities while in Chile, the U.S. government found him responsible for postal bombings of Cuban embassies in Lima, Madrid, Ottawa, and Buenos Aires. The U.S. also accused Bosch of involvement in the August 1975 attempted assassination of Emilio Aragones, the Cuban ambassador to Argentina, and the September 1976 bombing of the Mexican Embassy in Guatemala City. In February 1976, he was arrested by the police in Costa Rica, where he was traveling under a fake Chilean passport using the alias Hector Avanzo. After his arrest, the U.S. media reported that he had been involved in a plot to kill Henry Kissinger, then Secretary of State. The arrest resulted from Bosch's former and future colleague Posada passing information about Bosch's intentions to the CIA. When questioned, Bosch stated that his target was Andrés Pascal Allende, nephew of previous Chilean President Salvador Allende. The Costa Rican authorities offered to extradite him to the U.S., but the U.S. declined.

=== CORU and Flight 455 ===
Bosch was deported to the Dominican Republic, where he founded the Coordination of United Revolutionary Organizations (CORU), along with Posada, Gaspar Jiménez, and other Cuban exiles. The group, led by Bosch, first met in the Dominican Republic town of Bonao in June 1976, and laid plans for more than 50 bombings over the next year. The U.S. Federal Bureau of Investigation (FBI) described CORU as "an anti-Castro terrorist umbrella organization." CORU was responsible for a number of attacks in 1976. These included a machine gun attack on the Cuban embassy in Bogotá, the assassination of a Cuban official in Mérida, the kidnapping of two Cuban embassy employees in Buenos Aires, the bombing of a Cubana airlines office in Panama City, the bombing of the Guyanese embassy in Port of Spain, and the assassination of former Chilean ambassador Orlando Letelier, a staunch critic of the Pinochet government, in Washington, D.C. Subsequently, declassified documents showed that Letelier's assassination, part of a series that occurred during Operation Condor, was directly ordered by Pinochet. Michael Townley, an agent of Dirección de Inteligencia Nacional, the Chilean secret Police, was also involved in the killing.

Bosch was invited to return to Venezuela by Orlando García, the head of security for Venezuelan President Carlos Andrés Pérez. He returned on 23 September 1976, again traveling on a fraudulent passport. Bosch was given a hotel suite for his use, a DISIP identity card using the alias "Carlos Sucre", and a Venezuelan passport. He was told that he could continue his activities, but that his targets needed to be outside Venezuela. Among those who had apartments in the same hotel were Garcia, and Morales, who had testified against Bosch in Florida, and who was now Garcia's deputy. Soon after he arrived in Venezuela, a fundraiser was held in Caracas to support his activities. According to a CIA memorandum, Bosch offered to refrain from planning attacks in the U.S. during Andrés Pérez's forthcoming visit to the United Nations in November, if the Venezuelan government made "a substantial cash contribution to [Bosch's] organization" in return. Bosch was also reported to have stated, "Now that our organization has come out of the Letelier job looking good, we are going to try something else." After Letelier's assassination, a map of the route Letelier took to work was discovered in Bosch's office.

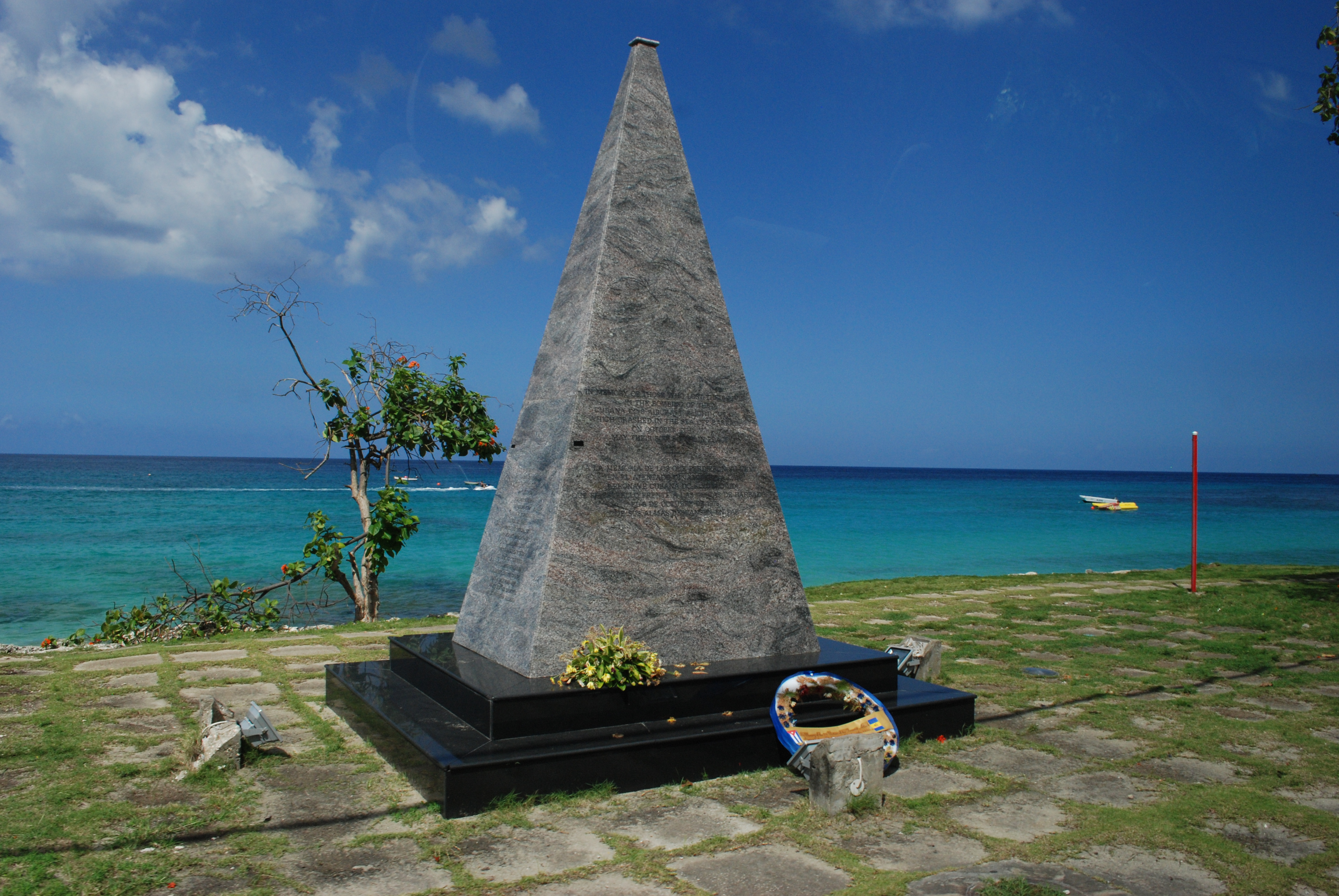
A memorial in Barbados erected in recognition of the 73 people killed in the crash of Cubana Flight 455

Several days later, Posada was reported to have stated that "we are going to hit a Cuban airplane" and "Orlando has the details." Flight 455 was a Cubana de Aviación flight departing from Trinidad to Cuba, via Barbados. On 6 October 1976, two time bombs variously described as dynamite or C-4 planted on the Douglas DC-8 aircraft exploded, killing all 73 people on board, including all 25 members of the 1975 Cuban national fencing team. Investigators from Cuba, Venezuela and the United States traced the planting of the bombs to two Venezuelan passengers, Freddy Lugo and Hernán Ricardo Lozano, who had taken the first leg of the flight from Trinidad to Barbados. Both men were employed by Posada at a private detective agency that he ran in Caracas. Ricardo had called both Posada's office, and Bosch, soon after the explosions on the plane. CORU released a statement soon after the bombing claiming responsibility for it, and describing the explosion as having killed "57 Cuban communists" (57 of the passengers had been Cuban). Several CIA memoranda from the period implicated Bosch and Posada in the attack. According to an FBI informant, Bosch received a phone call on 6 October, in which he was told "A bus with 73 dogs went off a cliff and all got killed."

A week later, Posada and Bosch were arrested on charges of masterminding the attack, and were jailed in Venezuela; Bosch's arrest occurred on 8 October 1976. Journalist Ann Louise Bardach described the arrests as becoming "a cause célèbre" for politicians in Miami, who lobbied the U.S. government to press for Bosch and Posada's release. Miami, Hialeah, and Sweetwater announced an official "Orlando Bosch Day", and Miami Mayor Maurice Ferré met Bosch while he was imprisoned. Some years later, Otto Reich, a fellow Cuban exile and U.S. Ambassador to Venezuela from 1986 to 1989, also lobbied the U.S. government to push for Bosch's release. Reich argued both that Bosch was innocent, and that his safety was threatened. Bosch was also visited by the House Select Committee on Assassinations, investigating an allegation, which Bosch denied, that he had been in a room with Lee Harvey Oswald in 1963. While Bosch was in prison in 1977, Miami area law enforcement officials linked Bosch to several dynamite bombings, including a blast in the offices of Mackey International after the airline announced plans to resume flights to Cuba.

The Cubana Flight case was initially placed before a civilian judge, who ruled that the court had no jurisdiction. In 1980, Bosch and the others were tried and acquitted by a military court of involvement in the bombing. Bosch and Ricardo were convicted of using false identity papers, and sentenced to four and a half months in prison, which were set against the time they had already been held. The court stated that although the flight had been brought down by a bomb, that there was insufficient evidence to prove the defendants were responsible. Bosch and the others remained imprisoned while the verdict was appealed. In 1983, another military court moved the case back to the civilian judicial system, and the trial was delayed further by Bosch and two others refusing to appear in court. In 1985, during this delay, Posada escaped from prison after bribing a guard using funds raised by the Cuban American National Foundation. Bosch's case was eventually resolved in 1986, when he was acquitted: Ricardo and Lugo were each sentenced to 20 years in prison. In total, Bosch was in prison for eleven years. He spent his time in prison writing and painting, and on multiple occasions went on hunger strikes to protest his situation.

=== Later career ===
Reich asked for permission to grant Bosch a visa to the U.S. on multiple occasions, the last of them in December 1987; his requests were denied. Bosch flew to Miami on 16 February 1988, despite not possessing a visa. On arrival, he was arrested for violating parole in the 1968 Polish freighter case, and also for entering the country illegally. A large campaign began demanding Bosch's release, among the leaders of which was Jorge Mas Canosa, head of the Cuban American National Foundation. Mas Canosa testified before a parole board, stating that Bosch and he had been friends for more than two decades, and that he was confident Bosch would not resume violent activities. Ileana Ros-Lehtinen advocated for Bosch's release during her successful 1988 congressional campaign, calling Bosch a patriot and a hero. Some of Bosch's militant supporters threatened to bomb the Miami office of the Immigration and Naturalization Services if Bosch was not released, though the threats were not carried out.

Despite this campaign, Bosch's application for asylum was rejected by the Justice Department in January 1989. In making his decision, Joe Whitley, at the time the Associate U.S. Attorney General, stated that Bosch had been "resolute and unwavering in his advocacy of terrorist violence", and that he had "demonstrated a willingness to cause indiscriminate injury and death." Agents of the local FBI, who investigated Bosch, stated that Bosch was considered "Miami's number one terrorist" by the FBI and other law enforcement groups. The Justice Department sought to deport him; 31 countries were asked to allow Bosch entry, but they all refused. Cuba expressed a willingness to take him, but his lawyers declined. After lobbying by Jeb Bush, then a campaign manager for Ros-Lehtinen, however, U.S. President George H. W. Bush overruled the recommendation of the Justice Department, and ordered Bosch's release. He was allowed to return to his home in Miami, where he was required to have his phone tapped, his whereabouts monitored, to keep a visitors' log, and to not associate with militants. Though he agreed to these conditions, he did not keep a log, and stated his intention to associate with whomever he please. Two years later, he was granted U.S. residency by the Bush administration.

After his release Bosch began working for Alberto Hernández, who succeeded Mas Canosa as chairman of the Cuban American National Foundation, earning $1,500 a month. In 1997 he was linked to the 1997 Cuba hotel bombings, in which one tourist was killed; he denied involvement, but stated that if he had, he would "still be denying it, since that's illegal in this country". He resumed painting, and used proceeds from the sales of his works to fund resistance to the Cuban government. He also formed an organization, named "Protagonist Party of the People", to raise money to buy weapons for the anti-Castro movement, violating the terms of his release in doing so. He claimed to have raised $150,000 by 1997.

== Legacy ==
In his later years, Bosch remained a controversial figure. He had considerable support among Cuban exiles in the US, and his funeral saw public demonstrations of mourning. In his 2010 memoirs, Bosch denied having planned the bombing, stating that Castro had "accused me, without evidence, of being the intellectual author of the sabotage of Flight 455 and many other acts with which I had nothing to do." However, he continued to justify the bombing, saying that it was a "legitimate act of war", and that everyone on board deserved to die, because they "were all Communists." The Cuban diplomat and historian Jesús Arboleya and the American journalist John Dinges state that Bosch was responsible for the bombing. Dick Thornburgh, United States Attorney General under Bush in 1988, referred to Bosch as an "unreformed terrorist", while the FBI considered CORU, which Bosch led, a terrorist organization. US diplomat Wayne Smith, an expert on Cuban affairs, also called Bosch a terrorist, and stated that he "did a disservice to the cause of democracy and freedom". Upon Bosch's release, an editorial in the New York Times accused the Bush administration of hypocrisy, stating that Bush was "squandering American credibility on issues of terrorism", and that he had protected "one of the hemisphere's most notorious terrorists." Reich's advocacy for Bosch created controversy when Reich was nominated to be Assistant Secretary of State for Western Hemisphere Affairs by the administration of George W. Bush in the early 2000s, and the Bush family's role in Bosch's release became an embarrassment for it in later years.

== See also ==
- United States and state-sponsored terrorism
