= Omega Force (disambiguation) =

Omega Force is a Japanese video game developer and division of Koei Tecmo.

Omega Force may also refer to:

- Omega 7, a Cuban anti-communist paramilitary group based in the United States
- Omega Effect, the power source of DC Comics' Darkseid's Omega Beams
