= Cuban Power =

Anti-Castro terrorist group in the United States

Cuban Power, also known as El Poder Cubano or United Cuban Power, was an anti-Castro terrorist group that conducted bombings against Cuban targets and states and entities they felt to be sympathetic to the Castro regime through early and mid-1968.

== List of attacks ==
- January 9, 1968: A packaged mailed by Cuban Power in New York exploded in a Havana post office, injuring five postal workers.
- January 25: Two parcels sent by Cuban Power exploded in Miami. The bombs were sent to All Cargo Transport, Inc., Servicios Especializados and Tiger's Garage. The first two were businesses which mailed food and clothing from Cuban exiles to the island through third countries. The latter was an American-owned small business with no apparent connection to Cuba. A police officer, Sgt. Russel Leasburg, was cut by flying glass when investigating one of the packages. A communiqué by the group warned that other bombs would be directed at people that did business with the Castro regime.
- February 8: The home of the British consul in Miami was bombed. Cuban Power was suspected.
- April 22: The Mexican consulate and the Spanish National Tourist Office in New York are bombed. A reproduction of the Cuban flag bearing the words "Cuban Power" was found at the Spanish office and a "Cuban Power" sign was left outside the Mexican one
- May 26: The home of the Mexican consul general Rafael Reyes Spindola, the Pan American Club and Les Violins restaurant are bombed in Miami.
- May 30: WNDT Channel 13 in New York was bombed.
- May 30: Japanese freighter Asaku Maru bombed in Tampa, Florida. The ship sustained $100,000 in damage.
- June 21: The Spanish National Tourist Office in New York was bombed a second time at 4:10 am. The blast destroyed the front windows, as well as the windows of two neighboring offices. Mimeographed circulars of the Declaration of principles of Cuban Power were found at the site.
- July 4: A bomb was left in a bed of ivy adjoining the Canadian and Australian tourist offices in New York.
- July 7: The Japanese National Tourist Office in Rockefeller Center was bombed, blowing out the front glass windows. Two passersby were injured: Shirley Schwabe, 42, who got glass splinters in her eye, and her daughter, Nancy, 16, who suffered lacerations on her foot.
- July 9: A bomb was placed on the fourth floor fire escape of a building next to the Yugoslav and Cuban UN Missions in New York exploded at 1 am. Every window on the Yugoslav mission was shattered and the Cuban mission received minor damage. An eight inch deep, two-foot-square hole was left in the private residence adjoining the fire escape.
- July 14: Chicago branch of the Mexican National Tourist Office was bombed.
- July 15: A bomb was discovered and dismantled in front of the French National Tourist Office at Rockefeller Center, New York.
- July 16: A bomb was placed outside the office of the Mexican consulate and airline, Aeronaves de México in Newark, New Jersey. Police find and dismantle it before it explodes.
- July 19: within seventeen minutes bombs exploded at the Mexican National Tourist Council in Beverly Hills, the Mexican Travel Agency, Air France, and the Shell Oil building in Los Angeles. Two hours later Japan Airlines was bombed. Red, white and blue "Unite Cuban Power" stickers were found at each location.
- July 26: Chicago branch of the Mexican National Tourist Office was bombed a second time. A "Cuban Power Unite!" sticker and a two-page handwritten letter are recovered at the site. Meanwhile, another anti-Castro group, the Secret Anti-Communist Army claimed responsibility for the Mexican, Spanish and Canadian bombings, while Movimento Nacional de Coalicion Cubana claimed responsibility for the French and Newark Mexican bombs.
- July 30: British consulate in Los Angeles was bombed. A red, white and blue "United Cuban Power" sticker was found at the scene.
- August 3: The street-level offices of the Bank of Tokyo Trust Company at the Waldorf-Astoria Hotel were bombed at 3:05 am. The blast destroyed furniture, three plate-glass windows, two sets of double doors with 3/4-inch thick glass, and the windows at a Trans World Airlines office across the street. Damage was estimated at $40,000. A man identifying himself as Arturo Rodriguez Vives, spokesman for Cuban Power, contacted the New York Post claiming that an attack on a tourist office or consulate was imminent.
- August 7: A night watchman found a bomb with a "Cuban Power" sticker on it at a travel agency at Wilshire Boulevard, Beverly Hills.
- August 8: The British cargo ship Caribbean Venture hit an underwater mine in Biscayne Bay, Miami. Cuban Power claims responsibility.
- August 17: A Mexican airline office in Miami was bombed.
- September 16: The Polish freighter Polanika was shot at while docked at Dodge Island, Miami.
- October 16: A bomb exploded at the Los Angeles offices of the Socialist Workers Party and the Young Socialist Alliance. A red white and blue "Cuban Power" sticker was found at the scene.
- October 23: Three sticks of dynamite tied together and a "Unite: Cuban Power" sticker were found at the SWP headquarters in Los Angeles. An anonymous caller had warned police

== Arrests and prosecution ==
Police made their first arrest in connection with Cuban Power when they arrested Ricardo Morales Navarrette on February 14. Navarette was a veteran of the Bay of Pigs Invasion, and allegedly worked with the CIA to aid the anti-communist underground in Cuba and had even been sent to the Congo to help anti-communist forces in 1964.

On August 13, police raided a Johnsonburg, New Jersey farm, seizing a half ton of dynamite, automatic weapons and ammunition, as well as a uniform of one of the guerrilla groups involved in the Bay of Pigs Invasion. Michael A. DeCarolis, 32, was arrested.

A federal grand jury handed down an indictment for nine Cuban exiles on October 10 in Miami. They were arrested and charged the next day. The testimony of Navarette was reportedly key to breaking the case. Three of the exiles, Orlando Bosch, Jose Diaz Morejon and Barbaro Balan Garcia were charged with the September 16 shooting of the Polanika. Bosch was also charged with making terroristic threats in a June 6 cable sent to Prime Minister Harold Wilson, Francisco Franco and President Gustavo Díaz Ordaz of Mexico, threatening to blow up their countries' ships if they continued to trade with Cuba. The six others were indicted for conspiracy to violate the neutrality acts of the US. J. Edgar Hoover announced this was the group connected with the bombings, but none were charged with crimes relating to the bombings. The other six were Aimee Miranda Cruz, Andres Jorge Gonzalez Gonzalez, Marco Rodríguez Ramos, Paulino Mariono Gutierrez Vidal, Jorge Luis Gutierrez Ulla and Jesus Dominguez Benitez.

A second arrest of nine other exiles took place in New York on October 23. The nine arrested in New York were indicted for arson, reckless endangerment, criminal mischief and Illegal possession of weapons and explosives. According to the indictment, the bombings were only the first phase of their plot. They planned to seize arms from the 16th Infantry armory in Brooklyn and use them for an assassination and bombing campaign that would have included the assassination of Ambassador Ricardo Alarcón. Those arrested included Oscar Acevedo, Gabriel Abay (both veterans of the Bay of Pigs), Guillermo Miguel, Arturo Rodríguez Vives, Jose Rodone, Ivan Acosta, Ramiro Cortés, Edgar Rives and Carlos Fernández.

Two final members of the group were arrested in Miami October 28 and charged with carrying out the group's bombings in California: Juan Garcia Cardenas and Hector Cornillot.

== See also ==
- Alpha 66
- Omega 7
- Coordination of United Revolutionary Organizations
- Operation 40
- Orlando Bosch
- Luis Posada Carriles
