= J. C. King =

American official

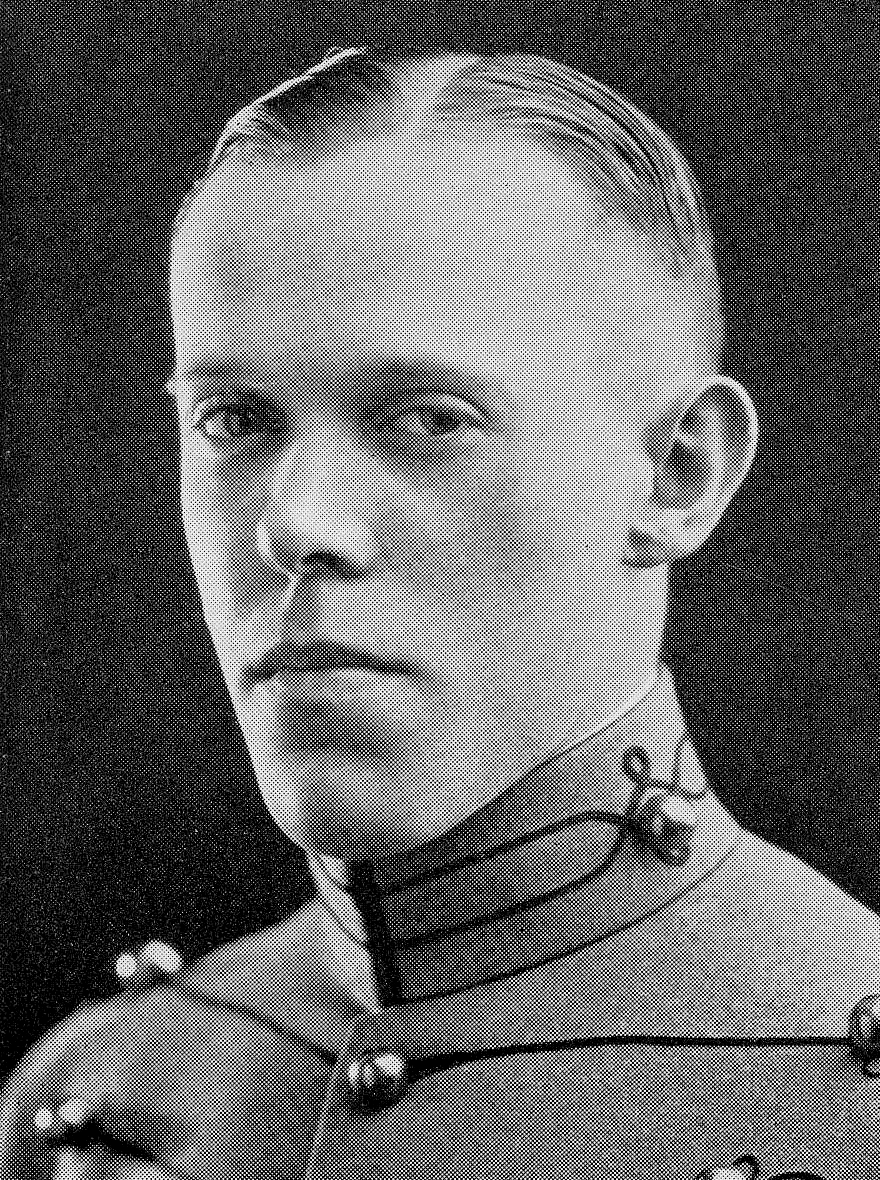
- At West Point in 1923
- Born: Joseph Caldwell King; October 5, 1900; Brooklyn, New York
- Died: January 27, 1977 (aged 76); Washington, D.C.
- Burial place: West Point Cemetery
- Education: United States Military Academy
- Occupations: Military officer, intelligence agent
- Spouses: Cristina Patricia Pernas; Ana Vilma Gaspar; Frances Anne Smith

Joseph Caldwell King (October 5, 1900 – January 27, 1977) was the Chief of the Western Hemisphere Division of the CIA in the 1950s and 1960s. He was also known by his CIA code name of Oliver G. Galbond and as Colonel J.C. King.

== Early life and marriage ==
On October 5, 1900, Joseph Caldwell King was born to Warren Charles King (December 8, 1876 – September 5, 1931) and Jessie Calhoun Caldwell in Brooklyn, New York. His father was a businessman and unsuccessful candidate for the New Jersey Republican gubernatorial nomination in 1919. King graduated from the Lawrenceville School in June 1918 and then enrolled at Princeton University in September. He left Princeton to enter the U.S. Military Academy at West Point in November 1918. King graduated as part of the Class of 1923 and was assigned the Cullum Register Number 6992.

Joseph Caldwell King married three times: first to Cristina Patricia Pernas in 1927, then to Ana Vilma Gaspar in 1942 and finally to Frances Anne Smith in 1954.

== Career ==
Second Lieutenant King served with the 16th Infantry in New York state before resigning his commission in May 1924. He enrolled at l'École Libre des Sciences Politiques in Paris, graduating from the diplomatic course in June 1925. King then went to work for his father's mining businesses in Mexico.

After leaving a job as vice president of his father's chemical business in New Jersey, King became a vice-president at Johnson and Johnson in charge of Brazil and Argentina. Then, he joined Nelson Rockefeller's Office of the Coordinator of Inter-American Affairs (OCIAA).

He was stationed in Argentina from 1941 to 1945, where he was engaged in feeding deceptive information to Japanese agents (see Thaddeus Holt, The Deceivers). For his service from July 1943 to November 1945 as an assistant military attaché in Argentina, Major King was awarded the Legion of Merit. He was promoted to lieutenant colonel in December 1945 and released from military intelligence duty in 1946. King was later promoted to colonel in the U.S. Army Reserve.

On December 11, 1959, King advocated that "thorough consideration" be given to the "elimination" of Fidel Castro, by which he may have meant assassination.

King officially retired from the CIA in 1967 but soon came back as a CIA consultant. He was CEO of the Amazon Natural Drug Company, known as a front for the CIA.

== Later life ==
King's health began deteriorating because of age and Parkinson's disease, and he died on January 27, 1977, in Washington, D.C. King and his third wife were buried at the United States Military Academy Post Cemetery in West Point, New York.

== See also ==
- Operation 40
- Bay of Pigs invasion
- Cuban Project
- Allen W. Dulles
