= Ricardo Morales (intelligence agent) =

Cuban exile; agent for the CIA

- Born: June 14, 1939; Havana, Cuba
- Died: December 20, 1982 (aged 43); Key Biscayne, Florida, U.S.
- Cause of death: Homicide by gunshot
- Military career
- Branch: Central Intelligence Agency; DISIP
- Conflicts: Bay of Pigs Invasion

Ricardo Morales Navarrete (June 14, 1939 – December 20, 1982), also known by the moniker "El Mono" or "Monkey", was a Cuban exile and agent of the United States Central Intelligence Agency. He also worked for the DISIP, or Venezuelan intelligence service, and as an informant for the U.S. FBI, CIA, and DEA.

== Biography ==
Ricardo Morales was born in Havana, Cuba on June 14, 1939. He fled Cuba and came to the United States in 1960. He worked for the U.S. Central Intelligence Agency (CIA) for a period, including a stint in the Congo in 1964, where he claimed to have killed hundreds while serving as a mercenary. He also worked in Miami while the CIA was looking to destabilize the Fidel Castro government in Cuba, and took part in the Bay of Pigs Invasion of Cuba in 1961. A report in the New York Times said that within the CIA, Morales was known for his "quick wits and courage".

=== Kennedy assassination ===
Morales has been a subject of discussion in relation to the assassination of John F. Kennedy. According to Morales son, Ricardo Morales Jr., his father told both him and his brother that "I didn’t do it but I was in Dallas two days before waiting for orders. We were the cleaning crew just in case something bad had to be done". He further said that he saw Lee Harvey Oswald at a CIA training camp and recognised him when his picture was circulated in the aftermath of the assassination.

=== Informant activity ===
In 1968, Cuban exile militant Orlando Bosch was arrested and tried for firing a bazooka at a Polish freighter. Morales, as an informant for the FBI, had infiltrated Bosch's group "Cuban Power", described by the government as a terrorist group. Morales taped his conversations with Bosch, and also gave him bogus explosives that were later used in a bomb placed on a British freight ship. As an FBI informant, Morales was among those who testified against Bosch at the trial, and the recordings of their conversations showed Bosch's knowledge of explosions on board foreign ships. Initially, Morales was among those arrested for the bombings, but was released as an informer. His testimony contributed to Bosch's conviction and imprisonment. Over the years, Morales would also serve as an informant for the Central Intelligence Agency and the Drug Enforcement Administration.

Over the next six years, Morales was the target of two unsuccessful assassination attempts, including a bomb attack on his car in April 1974. Two years later, when Bosch moved to Venezuela at the invitation of DISIP head Orlando García, Morales was serving as García's deputy, and had rooms in the same hotel that Bosch lived in.

=== Cubana Flight 455 bombing ===
On October 6, 1976, Cubana de Aviación Flight 455 was blown up in midair, killing all 73 people on board. Investigators traced the bombing to two Venezuelan passengers, Freddy Lugo and Hernán Ricardo Lozano, and soon after, Bosch and fellow Cuban exile Luis Posada Carriles were implicated in the attack and arrested in Venezuela. Soon after the bombing, Morales told the FBI that individuals in the Venezuelan government were involved in the bombing, and that Posada Carriles had knowledge of it.

In 1982, Morales, who had moved back to Miami and was testifying for the government in a narcotics investigation, claimed responsibility for the bombing himself, stating that the men who had planted the bomb worked for him. Morales later claimed to friends that he had helped plan and carry out the bombing, and that the C4 used in the explosion came from a DISIP storeroom, with García's knowledge. In a 2006 interview, Bosch stated that before his arrest he was summoned to Morales's office, and offered some money and the chance to leave Venezuela, which he declined. In the same year, Posada Carriles denied involvement in the bombings, and claimed that Morales was responsible. The case that followed the narcotics investigation in 1982 was thrown out of court by a judge who stated that Morales lacked credibility as a witness. Those charged in the case included Rafael Villaverde, another Cuban exile trained by the CIA. Villaverde disappeared in a boating accident near the Bahamas shortly after his arrest in March 1982.

Morales claimed that the plane, which carried the entire Cuban fencing team, secretly carried Cuban DGI operatives.

=== Death ===
Morales died on December 20, 1982, after being shot by an off-duty police officer during a fight in a bar on Key Biscayne. He was 43 years old. After a month-long investigation, the police stated that his death was a justifiable homicide for which nobody would face charges. Morales' attorney, John Komorowski, commented "If you believe that, I've got a piece of expressway I'll sell you cheap." Journalist Ann Louise Bardach stated that the circumstances of the death were never clarified. In reporting his death, The Washington Post described him as a "spy, counterspy, mercenary, confessed murderer, bomber, informer, dope dealer and operator extraordinary". Morales' son, Robert Morales, was killed in the 2025 Florida State University shooting in Tallahassee.
