= Luis Posada Carriles =

Cuban militant and CIA agent (1928–2018)

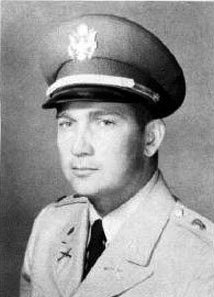
- Luis Posada at Fort Benning, Georgia, US, 1962
- Born: February 15, 1928; Cienfuegos, Cuba
- Died: May 23, 2018 (aged 90); Miami, Florida, US

Luis Clemente Posada Carriles (February 15, 1928 – May 23, 2018) was a Cuban exile militant and Central Intelligence Agency (CIA) agent. He was considered a terrorist by the United States' Federal Bureau of Investigation (FBI) and the Government of Cuba, among others.

Born in Cienfuegos, Cuba, Posada fled to the United States after a spell of anti-Castro activism. He helped organize the Bay of Pigs Invasion, and after it failed, became an agent for the CIA. He received training at Fort Benning, and from 1964 to 1967 was involved with a series of bombings and other covert activities against the Cuban government, before joining the Venezuelan intelligence service. Along with Orlando Bosch, he was involved in founding the Coordination of United Revolutionary Organizations, described by the FBI as "an anti-Castro terrorist umbrella organization". Posada and CORU are widely considered responsible for the 1976 bombing of a Cuban airliner that killed 73 people. Posada later admitted involvement in a string of bombings in 1997 targeting fashionable Cuban hotels and nightspots. In addition, he was jailed under accusations related to an assassination attempt on Fidel Castro in Panama in 2000, although he was later pardoned by Panamanian President Mireya Moscoso in the final days of her term. He denied involvement in the airline bombing and the alleged plot against Castro in Panama, but admitted to fighting to overthrow the Castro regime in Cuba.

In 2005, Posada was held by US authorities in Texas on the charge of being in the country illegally: the charges were later dismissed. A judge ruled he could not be deported because he faced the threat of torture in Venezuela. The US government refused to repatriate Posada to Cuba, citing the same reason. His release on bail in 2007 elicited angry reactions from the Cuban and Venezuelan governments. The US Justice Department had urged the court to keep him in jail because he was "an admitted mastermind of terrorist plots and attacks", a flight risk and a danger to the community. The decision was also criticized within the US; an editorial in the Los Angeles Times stated that by releasing Posada while detaining a number of suspected terrorists in Guantánamo Bay, the US government was guilty of hypocrisy.

Posada died in May 2018 in Florida, where hardline elements of the anti-Castro exile community in Miami still regarded him as "a heroic figure". Reporter Ann Louise Bardach called him "Fidel Castro's most persistent would-be assassin," while Peter Kornbluh of the National Security Archive referred to him as "one of the most dangerous terrorists in recent history" and the "godfather of Cuban exile violence."

== Early years (1928–1968) ==
Posada was born in Cienfuegos, Cuba, on February 15, 1928. His family was relatively affluent. He had four siblings. The family moved to Havana when Posada was 17 years old, where he studied medicine and chemistry at the University of Havana. Posada worked in 1958 as a supervisor for the Firestone Tire and Rubber Company. He worked initially in Havana, and was transferred to Akron, Ohio, after the Cuban Revolution of 1959.

As a student, he had come in contact with Fidel Castro, who had become a figure of some significance in the student politics of the time. Posada later said that Castro was three years ahead of him at the university. Misgivings about the Cuban revolution led Posada to become an activist in open opposition to the new government. After a spell in a military prison, Posada sought political asylum in Mexico. By 1961, Posada had relocated to the United States where he helped to organize the failed Bay of Pigs Invasion of Cuba. The rest of Posada's family remained in Cuba, and continued to support the Cuban revolution; Posada's sister eventually rose to the rank of Colonel in the Cuban army. When asked in a 1998 interview why he had opposed the Revolution, he stated "All communists are the same. All are bad, a form of evil." Posada was stationed in Guatemala, where he was supposed to participate in a second wave of landings in Cuba. The initial attack on Cuban soil failed, and the operation was called off before Posada's force was to take part.

After the failure at the Bay of Pigs, Posada attended officer candidate school at the United States Army's facility in Fort Benning. There, he was trained by the CIA in sabotage and explosives between March 1963 and March 1964. While at Fort Benning, he served in the same platoon as Jorge Mas Canosa, later the founder of the Cuban American National Foundation: the two men became fast friends. He graduated from the training program with the rank of second lieutenant, but he and Mas Canosa left the army when they recognized that the US was unlikely to invade Cuba again. In a 1998 interview, he stated that "the CIA taught us everything ... explosives, how to kill, bomb, trained us in acts of sabotage." Posada received further training in guerrilla tactics in Polk City, Florida. He worked closely with the CIA in Miami and was active in the CIA's Operation 40. He later described his role as that of the agency's "principal agent", informing the organisation about political movements within the exile community and operating anti-Castro activities.

In Florida, Posada trained members of the JURE, Junta Revolucionaria Cubana, an anti-Castro militant organization. He was also associated with other militant groups, including RECE (Cuban Representation in Exile). CIA files indicate that Posada was involved in a 1965 attempt to overthrow the Guatemalan government. The same year, the CIA reported that Posada was involved in various bombing plans in association with Mas Canosa. Posada also supplied information about the Cuban exile community to the CIA, and unsuccessfully attempted to recruit his brother to spy for them. In 1968, relations frayed with the CIA when Posada was questioned about his "unreported association with gangster elements". Posada's other associates at the time included Frank Rosenthal, described as a "well-known gangster". Posada relocated to Venezuela, taking with him various CIA-supplied weapons including grenades and fuses.

== Venezuela (1968–1985) ==
In Venezuela, Posada quickly rose through the ranks of Venezuelan intelligence. He became head of the service, known as DIGEPOL and later as DISIP, in 1969. The role involved countering various guerrilla movements supported by Cuba, and Posada threw himself into his work with enthusiasm. He invited Orlando Bosch, another Cuban exile who was then on parole from US federal prison, to join his operations in Venezuela: Bosch accepted his offer in 1974, thereby violating the terms of his parole. Posada was dismissed from the service in 1974 due to ideological differences with the government of Carlos Andrés Pérez, who had assumed office in that year. Posada went on to found a private detective agency in Caracas.

At approximately the same time, Posada's relations with the CIA also deteriorated. The agency began to suspect that he was involved in cocaine trafficking and dealing in counterfeit money. Posada was not confronted with these allegations to avoid compromising existing operations, but internal CIA communications referred to him as a serious liability. The Church Committee hearings of 1975, which had been triggered by fears that the CIA were running too many rogue operations, had a significant impact on the agency, and Posada's association was seen to be "not in good odor". In February 1976, the CIA officially broke off relations with Posada. Subsequently, Posada made several efforts to get back into the agency's good graces, including informing on an alleged plot by Bosch to kill Henry Kissinger, then US Secretary of State.

=== Coordination of United Revolutionary Organizations ===
Along with Orlando Bosch and Gaspar Jiménez, Posada founded the Coordination of United Revolutionary Organizations (CORU). The group first met in the Dominican Republic in June 1976, and laid plans for more than 50 bombings over the next year. The US Federal Bureau of Investigation (FBI) described CORU as "an anti-Castro terrorist umbrella organization." CORU was responsible for a number of attacks in 1976. These included a machine gun attack on the Cuban embassy in Bogotá, the assassination of a Cuban official in Mérida, Yucatán, the kidnapping of two Cuban embassy employees in Buenos Aires, the bombing of a Cubana airlines office in Panama City, the bombing of the Guyanese embassy in Port of Spain, and the assassination of former Chilean ambassador Orlando Letelier in Washington, D.C.

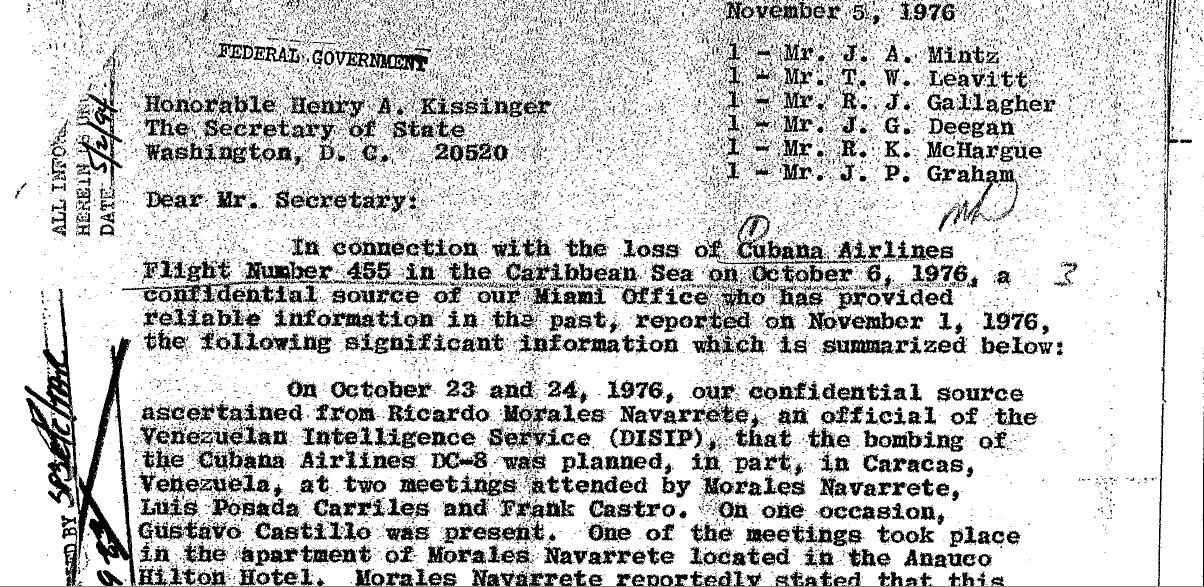
Declassified FBI report that reads: "Our confidential source ascertained ... that the bombing of the Cubana Airlines DC-8 was planned, in part, in Caracas, Venezuela, at two meetings attended by Morales Navarrete, Luis Posada Carriles and Frank Castro"

The information Posada provided the CIA while attempting to reestablish good relations with it included a tip that Cuban exiles were planning to blow up a Cuban airliner. Cubana Flight 455 was a Cubana de Aviación flight departing from Barbados, via Trinidad, to Cuba. On October 6, 1976, two time bombs variously described as dynamite or C-4 planted on the Douglas DC-8 aircraft exploded, killing all 73 people on board, including all 25 members of the 1975 Cuban national fencing team. Investigators from Cuba, Venezuela and the United States traced the planting of the bombs to two Venezuelan passengers, Freddy Lugo and Hernán Ricardo Lozano. Both men were employed by Posada at his private detective agency based in Venezuela. A week later, Posada and Bosch were arrested on charges of masterminding the attack, and were jailed in Venezuela.

Declassified FBI and CIA reports also show that the agencies suspected his involvement in the airline bombing within days of its occurrence. According to a declassified CIA document dated October 13, 1976, with information from what the CIA deemed a usually reliable source, Posada – in Caracas at the time – was overheard to say a few days before Cubana flight 455 exploded: "We are going to hit a Cuban airliner ... Orlando has the details". The details were contained in a memorandum sent to Kissinger. The memorandum suggested that Posada was likely to have planned the bombing. Another CIA document, based on a Miami-based informant, also implicated Posada in the conspiracy.

Posada, who denied involvement in the Cubana-455 bombing, insisted his "only objective was to fight for Cuba's freedom". In prison, Posada and Bosch learned to paint, and sold their artwork in the US via intermediaries. Posada was found not guilty by a military court; however, this ruling was overturned and he was held for trial in a civilian court. Posada escaped from prison with Freddie Lugo in 1977, and the pair turned themselves in to the Chilean authorities, expecting to be welcomed for their role in the killing of Letelier, who was a target of the government of Augusto Pinochet: however, they were immediately handed back to Venezuela. Posada was held awaiting trial in Venezuela for eight years before escaping in 1985 while awaiting a prosecutor's appeal of his second acquittal in the bombing. His escape is said to have involved a hefty bribe and his dressing as a priest. According to Posada, the escape was planned and financed by Jorge Mas Canosa, who by then had become head of the Cuban American National Foundation. He spent fifteen days hiding out in Caracas before making his way via a shrimp boat to Aruba in the Netherlands Antilles where he spent a week. He then flew to Costa Rica and finally to El Salvador.

== Contras and Central America (1985–2005) ==
Posada was met in El Salvador by CIA operative Félix Rodríguez, who told Posada that he was supporting him "at the request of a wealthy Miami benefactor". Rodríguez had overseen the capture of Ernesto "Che" Guevara in 1967. He offered Posada a job as his deputy, ferrying supplies to the Contra rebels in Nicaragua, in an operation directed by Lieutenant Colonel Oliver North: the pair were to coordinate drops of military supplies to the rebels, who opposed the Sandinista government. Posada's fortunes rose after the Reagan administration took a more confrontational approach to Cuba and expanded covert operations in Latin America. Posada was given a house and a car, and paid $3,000 per month, $750 for each flight he made, and sundry expenses, primarily by US Major General Richard Secord, who was directing operations for North. Posada was responsible for managing supply flights from the Salvadoran base of Ilopango to the Contra rebels at the border. He was also responsible for coordinating between the Contras, their advisers in the US, and their allies in the military forces of El Salvador. Operating with the Salvadoran alias "Ramón Medina", Posada built relationships inside the government of El Salvador, its military, and its infamous death squads.

The supply flights to the Contra rebels ceased in 1986, after the Nicaraguan government shot down one of the planes. Two of the crew were killed, including a close friend of Posada's. American pilot Eugene Hasenfus survived, thanks to his oft-mocked habit of wearing a parachute, and was captured by the Nicaraguan government. He confessed to the role of the US government in supporting the Contras, and his story made headlines around the world. Posada was supposed to have been on the flight himself, but missed the flight narrowly. After Hasenfus's capture became known, Posada gathered a group of soldiers and flew to San Salvador, where he emptied the safe houses used by the operation. By getting rid of this evidence, he would later claim, he saved George H. W. Bush and Ronald Reagan from impeachment.

Posada was forced to remain in hiding in El Salvador during the Iran-Contra hearings before signing up as a security advisor to the Guatemalan government. He also remained in contact with Cuban exile groups during this period. In February 1990, Posada was shot while sitting in his car in Guatemala City by unknown assailants that Posada believed were Cuban assassins. In his memoir, Posada said that his recovery and medical bills were paid by the Cuban American National Foundation, with additional payments from Secord. Posada recuperated in Honduras, where the FBI believed him to have had a role in 41 bombings in the country. Posada himself admitted to planning numerous attacks against Cuba. His ploys included attempting to use information obtained from a Honduran captain about the movement of Cuban ships to place a mine on a freighter, and using a base in Honduras to launch an attack on Cuba with a force of Cuban exiles. Despite paying large bribes to the Honduran military for their support with the latter scheme, Posada eventually abandoned this plan, believing he could not trust the Honduran military.

=== Terrorist bombings of 1997 ===
In 1997, Posada was implicated in a series of terrorist bombings in Cuba intended to deter the growing tourism trade on the island. An Italian-born Canadian national, Fabio di Celmo, was killed and 11 others were wounded as a result. In reaction to di Celmo's death, Posada told reporter Ann Louise Bardach of The New York Times in a 1998 taped interview that "the Italian was in the wrong place at the wrong time, but I sleep like a baby." In a taped interview, Posada said: "It is sad that someone is dead, but we can't stop." He added that Raúl Ernesto Cruz León, the man arrested and charged with the bombings, was a mercenary in his employ. Cruz León was sentenced to death by the Cuban authorities after admitting to the attacks; the sentence was later commuted to 30 years imprisonment. Posada repudiated his statements after being arrested in Panama in 2000. Posada was reportedly disappointed with the reluctance of news organisations in the US to report the bombing attacks, saying "If there is no publicity, the job is useless".

In 1998, The New York Times indicated that, even after the US government no longer sponsored Posada's violent activities, Posada may have benefited from a tolerant attitude on the part of US law enforcement. As bombs were being placed in tourist hotels and restaurants in Havana, The New York Times reported, a Cuban-American business-partner of Posada's tried to inform first Guatemalan, then US, law enforcement of Posada's involvement and possible links to Cuban exiles in Union City, New Jersey. Posada himself suggested his friendship with an FBI agent made it unlikely he would be officially implicated; the FBI denied claims of any friendship.

According to Posada, much of his funding in this period came through Mas Canosa and the Cuban American National Foundation, and that Mas Canosa was aware of his role in the bombings. The Cuban Ministry of the Interior claimed that on the September 4, 1997, three bomb attacks against hotels in Havana, in which one person was killed, were planned and controlled by CANF. CANF denied the allegations. Jose Antonio Llama, a former board member of CANF, stated in an interview published in 2006 that several of its leaders planned attacks in Cuba during the 1990s. In 1997, CANF published a statement refusing to condemn terrorist attacks against Cuba; the CANF chairman at the time stated that "We do not think of these as terrorist actions". The CANF repeatedly denied links with Posada and his activities after the publication of the 1998 interview, and threatened The New York Times with legal action. Multiple members of the foundation, however, confirmed links with Posada.

=== Arrest, conviction and release in Panama ===
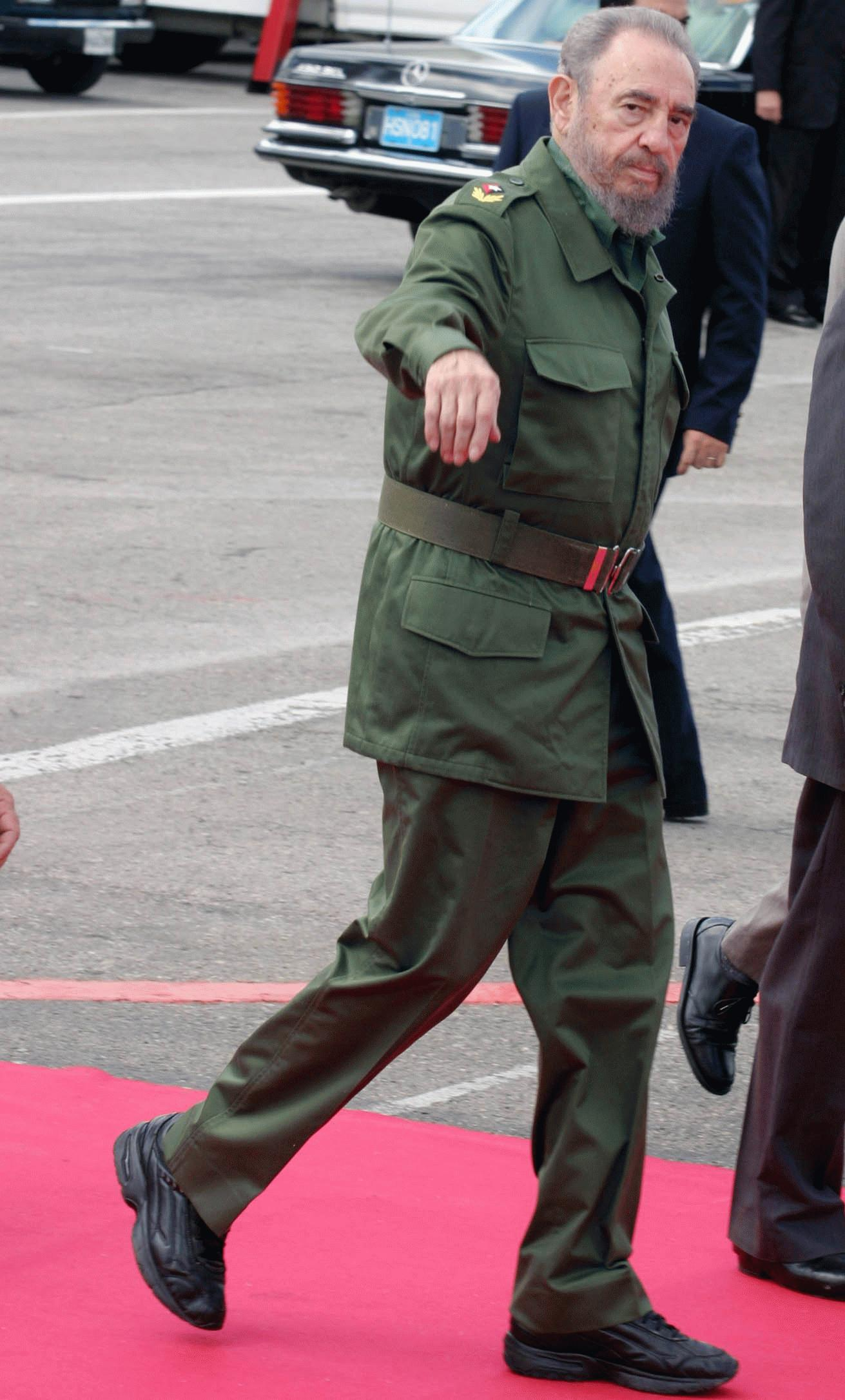
Fidel Castro, the target of an alleged failed assassination attempt in 2000

In October 1997 Posada was implicated in an assassination attempt on Fidel Castro, after four men were arrested by the US Coast Guard in a boat off the coast of Puerto Rico. He denied any involvement, and called the plot amateurish, but was believed to have been involved by the FBI. On November 17, 2000, Posada was discovered with 200 pounds of explosives in Panama City and arrested for plotting the assassination of Castro, who was visiting the country for the first time since 1959. Three other Cuban exiles were also arrested: Gaspar Jiménez who worked at the Cuban American National Foundation in Miami, Pedro Remón Rodríguez and Guillermo Novo. While in prison, Posada released a statement renouncing terrorism, and stating that he had been framed for the assassination attempt in Panama by the Cuban intelligence services. By mid-2001, $200,000 had been raised via efforts on Miami radio for a defense fund for Posada and his colleagues.

Castro announced the alleged discovery of the plot on international television, describing Posada as "a cowardly man totally without scruples". He also blamed CANF for allegedly orchestrating the plot. Shortly after, Justino di Celmo, the father of Fabio di Celmo, the victim of one of the Havana bombings, appeared on Cuban television to urge the Panamanian authorities to extradite Posada to Cuba. Posada was subsequently convicted and jailed in Panama for the assassination attempt. Bardach described him as "Fidel Castro's most persistent would-be assassin. Posada was convicted of plotting to assassinate Castro; the plot allegedly involved using dynamite to blow up an auditorium full of college students.

No foreign government has pressured me to take the decision, I knew that if these men stayed here, they would be extradited to Cuba and Venezuela, and there they were surely going to kill them there.

— Panamanian President Mireya Moscoso

In August 2004, Posada and the three other convicted plotters were pardoned by outgoing Panamanian president Mireya Moscoso. Moscoso, who had been close to the Bush administration in the US, denied that she had been pressured by US officials to engineer a release of the men, and US officials said they were not involved. "This was a decision made by the government of Panama", said State Department spokesman J. Adam Ereli. "We never lobbied the Panamanian government to pardon anyone involved in this case, and I'd leave it to the government of Panama to discuss the action." President Mireya Moscoso also commented, saying that "No foreign government has pressured me to take the decision", she told reporters. "I knew that if these men stayed here, they would be extradited to Cuba and Venezuela, and there they were surely going to kill them there."

Moscoso's decision was condemned by incoming Panamanian president Martín Torrijos, and speculation was rife that the pardon was politically motivated. Cuba expert Julia E. Sweig said the decision "reeks of political and diplomatic cronyism". Immediately after news of the pardon broke, Venezuela and Cuba withdrew diplomatic ties with Panama.

== United States (2005–2018) ==
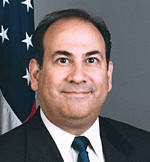
Roger Noriega, then US Assistant Secretary of State for Western Hemisphere Affairs. At the time of Posada's arrest in the US, Noriega stated that the charges against Posada "may be a completely manufactured issue".

In 2005, Posada requested political asylum in the United States through his attorney. On May 3, 2005, the Supreme Tribunal of Venezuela approved an extradition request for him. Although he was arrested following international pressure on the administration of George W. Bush to treat him on par with other suspects in the war on terror, the US refused to extradite him to either Venezuela or Cuba. On September 28, 2005, a US immigration judge ruled that Posada could not be deported because he faced the threat of torture in Venezuela. The Venezuelan government reacted angrily to the ruling, accusing the US of having a "double standard in its so-called war on terrorism". The United States government sought to deport Posada elsewhere, but at least seven friendly nations refused to accept him.

Posada was referenced in Venezuelan President Hugo Chávez's address to the United Nations General Assembly on September 20, 2006. Railing against the US for "imperialism" and "hypocrisy", Chávez called Posada "the biggest terrorist of this continent", and said: "Thanks to the CIA and government officials, he was allowed to escape, and he lives here in this country, protected by the government."

During a United Nations Security Council meeting to review the work of its three subsidiary counter-terrorism committees, the US was invited by the representatives of Venezuela and Cuba to comment on the evidence (above) in the Posada case. The US representative, Willson, stated that "an individual cannot be brought for trial or extradited unless sufficient evidence has been established that he has committed the offence charged." Willson said removal to Venezuela or Cuba could not be carried out because, she claimed, "it was more likely than not that he would be tortured if he were so transferred." The Venezuelan representative denied the allegation, and pointed to the United States' own record in Abu Ghraib and in Guantánamo as examples of what Venezuela would not do.

He is not being charged as a terrorist but rather as a liar. My family and I are outraged and disappointed that a known terrorist, Luis Posada, is going to trial for perjury and immigration fraud, not for the horrific crime of masterminding the bombing of a civilian airliner.

— Livio di Celmo, whose brother Fabio di Celmo was killed in the 1997 bombings in Havana

On May 8, 2007, US district judge Kathleen Cardone dismissed seven counts of immigration fraud and ordered the removal of Posada's electronic bracelet. In a 38-page ruling, Cardone criticized the US government's "fraud, deceit and trickery" during the interview with immigration authorities that was the basis of the charges against Posada. Cardone's ruling was overturned in mid-2008 by the United States Court of Appeals for the Fifth Circuit, which ruled that Posada should be tried for the alleged immigration violation.

In 2009, a federal grand jury issued a superseding indictment, which marked the first time Posada was officially linked by the US government to the 1997 bombings in Cuba. On April 9, 2009, the Miami Herald reported:

The superseding indictment from the grand jury in El Paso does not charge Posada, 81, with planting the bombs or plotting the bombings but with lying in an immigration court about his role in the attacks at hotels, bars and restaurants in the Havana area. The perjury counts were added to the previous indictment that accused Posada of lying in his citizenship application about how he got into the United States. Another new charge is obstruction of a US investigation into "international terrorism."

=== 2010 Texas trial ===
The bottom line is that the Justice Department is trying to hold him accountable for horrible acts of terrorism ... This trial can confirm what everybody already knows, (that) Luis Posada is a leading purveyor of terrorism.

— Peter Kornbluh, National Security Archive, February 25, 2010

Posada was accused of lying to US authorities about his entry into the country and about his alleged involvement in bomb attacks in Havana in 1997, and went on trial in Texas. Many of his backers in the Cuban exile community gathered thousands of dollars for his defense during what they termed a "radio marathon" on Radio Mambí. His charges did not relate to his alleged involvement in the bombing of the Cubana airliner, or in the bombings in Havana. Instead, they revolved around lying to immigration agents about his trip to the US and illegally entering the United States. The fact that he was not tried for murder or terrorism was strongly criticized by Cuba and Venezuela, while the Center for Democracy in the Americas described it as "charging Al Capone with tax evasion".

Prosecutors alleged that Posada deceived them about his passport and arrived on a boat named the Santrina, not on a bus as he had told the government during interviews. Posada was acquitted on all charges against him in 2011. A spokesman of the US Justice Department expressed disappointment in the outcome, while the Cuban and Venezuelan governments denounced the trial: Venezuela stated that the US was protecting a known terrorist.

== Personal life ==
Posada married in 1955. He separated from his first wife a few years after first moving to the US. He married his second wife, Elina Nieves, in 1963 while at Fort Benning. Nieves and he had a son while still in the US: a daughter was born after the family had moved to Venezuela in 1968. Posada and Nieves lived apart for most of their marriage. He had a lengthy relationship with Titi Bosch, who died of cancer in 2001. Towards the end of his life, Posada lived in Miami, where he often attended fund raisers among the right-wing exile groups, and participated in protests against the government of Fidel Castro. Among Cuban exiles, he was nicknamed "Bambi".

A November 2016, El Nuevo Herald newspaper article described Posada in a Miami restaurant celebrating Castro's death. The article reported that the then-88-year-old Posada was a cancer survivor and had suffered a stroke. He died on May 23, 2018, in Miami, aged 90: an obituary in The Washington Post stated that he had been diagnosed with throat cancer five years previously. His lawyer stated that Posada Carriles died at "a government home for veterans".

== See also ==
- Criticism of the war on terrorism
- Cuban Five
