= Gaspar Jiménez =

Cuban exile linked to Posada Carriles

Gaspar Jiménez Escobedo (October 6, 1935 – October 29, 2014) was a Cuban exile living in Miami. An associate of Luis Posada Carriles, he was convicted of attempting to kidnap a Cuban consul in Mexico in 1976, for which he served 27 months in prison. He was also convicted of attempting to assassinate Cuban President Fidel Castro in Panama in 2000, and was jailed until 2004 when he was pardoned by outgoing Panamanian President Mireya Moscoso.

== Biography ==
Jiménez was born on October 6, 1935, in the Cuban city of Camagüey. He worked as a day laborer in Miami for some time, and had a wife and two daughters in 1983. Jiménez was a naturalized US citizen. A physically imposing man who weighed 300 pounds, Jiménez was nicknamed "El Gordo", or "Fat". Jiménez worked for Alberto Hernández, who would later head the Cuban American National Foundation, in the 1990s, and later worked for the foundation himself.

In July 1976, Jiménez and an associate named Orestes Ruiz were arrested in Mexico, and accused of attempting to kidnap Cuban consul Daniel Ferrer. Ferrer's bodyguard, Artagnan Diaz, was killed in the attempt. A third accused, Gustavo Castillo, avoided arrest and returned to the US. A Mexican court convicted them of involvement in the kidnapping, and convicted Ruiz of shooting the bodyguard. According to the Miami Herald, both Jiménez and Castillo had been described by a US Justice Department memorandum as having "extensive backgrounds in terrorist activities", mostly outside the US. A report by the Federal Bureau of Investigation into terrorist activities targeting the Cuban government of Fidel Castro prominently mentioned both Castillo and Jiménez. After their arrest, a US Federal prosecutor stated that the two had been linked to anti-Castro bombings in Latin America; the men denied the allegations.

In March 1977, Jiménez managed to escape from prison, and returned to Miami. Jiménez and Castillo were both arrested in Miami by US authorities in January 1978, and deported to Mexico to serve their sentences in 1981. The Cuban-American community in Miami lobbied heavily for his release, but the US Supreme Court did not block his extradition. Jiménez's initial 9-year sentence was reduced to reflect the time that he worked while in prison, and the three years he spent imprisoned in the United States awaiting extradition, he was freed in May 1983. In 1981, Jiménez and Castillo were indicted by a grand jury for a bombing attack against Cuban-American radio presenter Emilio Milián in 1976; Jiménez had been identified as a leading suspect by investigators in the case. A witness said he saw Jiménez working on Milian's car shortly before the bombing. However, soon after Jiménez's release from prison, the indictment was dropped, with the prosecuting attorney stating that there was insufficient evidence. No one was prosecuted for the bombing.

Jiménez worked for a while as a courier carrying money and messages to Luis Posada Carriles, a Cuban exile associated with multiple terrorist attacks against the Cuban government. An acquaintance of Jiménez stated that the money came from Cuban exiles in Miami. On November 17, 2000, 200 pounds of explosives were discovered in Panama City in the possession of Posada Cariles. Posada and three others, including Jiménez and Guillermo Novo, were arrested for plotting to assassinate Castro, who was then visiting Panama for the first time since 1959. While Jiménez and the others were incarcerated in Panama, Cuban-American US congressmen Lincoln and Mario Díaz-Balart wrote to Panamanian President Mireya Moscoso asking for their release. Convicted in 2004, the four men were pardoned by Moscoso shortly before she left office later the same year. Jiménez died on October 29, 2014, of natural causes: he was 79 years old.
