= Omega 7 =

Anti-Castro Cuban group

- Leader: Eduardo Arocena
- Dates active: 1974–1983
- Country: United States
- Allegiance: Cuban opposition
- Headquarters: Miami, Florida
- Active regions: Florida, Cuba, New York
- Ideology: Anti-Castroism; Anti-communism
- Political position: Right-wing

Omega 7 was an anti-Castro Cuban group based in Florida and New York made up of Cuban exiles whose stated goal was to overthrow Fidel Castro. The group had fewer than 20 members. According to the Global Terrorism Database, Omega 7 was responsible for at least 55 known anti-Castro attacks over the span of eight years with a majority of them being bombs. The group also took part in multiple high-profile murders and assassination attempts and has committed four known murders. Among their assassinations was Felix Garcia Rodriguez, a Cuban delegate who was gunned down on the 6th anniversary of the group. The group had conspired to assassinate Fidel Castro during the Cuban leader's visit to the United Nations in 1979.

== History ==
Eduardo Arocena was born in Cuba on February 26, 1943, and was in school until the start of Castro's regime in 1959. Arocena was a gifted amateur wrestler who had considered taking part in the Olympics. Arocena had been collaborating with other Cuban expatriates and exiles and taking part in activities against Castro that included the destruction of many crucial industrial and agricultural locations.

Arocena eventually left to the United States out of fear of his anti-regime actions being exposed. While in the U.S. Arocena resided in New Jersey where he worked in a warehouse and started a family.

Dissatisfied with the political opposition to Fidel Castro at the time, during the 1970s Arocena began to recruit Cuban veterans from the Bay of Pigs Invasion in 1961. In addition to this Arocena would go on to pull members in other anti-Castro exile groups as well, eventually forming his Omega 7 group on September 11, 1974. The New Jersey branch was made up of seven members (for which the group was named) including Arocena himself, Jose Juilio Garcia, Pedro Remon, Andres Garcia, Alberto Perez, Eduardo Ochoa, and Eduardo Losada-Fernandez.

As the tactical commander of the group, Arocena has stated that the CIA trained him in 1967 in bomb making and a variety of other warfare skills and tactics, although the CIA has never directly confirmed this. Pedro Remon took part in most of Omega 7's attacks and had the duty of calling local radio stations after each assassination or bombing. Most of the other members typically participated in more minor roles within the group. It is believed that the number of members in Omega 7 has never exceeded 20.

The group was primarily funded by Cuban businessmen, but received additional funding in the early 1980s from marijuana drug traffickers. Although the group never took part in the selling or buying of narcotics, the group did perform collection tasks as well as other assignments given to them by the drug traffickers. One narcotics supplier in particular, known as Manuel Fernandez, would offer Arocena and the group large quantities of cash in exchange for their services.

One of these tasks included an assassination attempt on Luis Fuentes a rival drug dealer to Fernandez. Fernandez eventually went on to testify against Arocena and Omega 7 claiming that they were paid up to $150,000 for their services despite never receiving his collection money from group, he also stated that he had sold two submachine guns to Omega 7. Eduardo Arocena was arrested in Miami on July 22, 1983, Omega 7 became inactive shortly after his arrest.

=== Indictment of Eduardo Arocena ===
On September 22, 1984, Eduardo Arocena was convicted on 26 charges which included murder and bombings, many of which Arocena confessed to prior to his conviction. Arocena was ruled to serve a mandatory life sentence. During Eduardo Arocena's trial, he claimed to have been taken to the FBI offices in New York City where he accused the Bureau of drugging him to the point of unconsciousness to which he found needle marks in his arms when he awoke. According to Arocena, the FBI had tried to coerce him into speaking about a variety of terrorist groups and operations. This story has never been confirmed by the F.B.I. When Eduardo Arocena was put on trial he initially denied being the leader of Omega 7, claiming that he was simply "obsessed with Communism" and had worked alongside the C.I.A. in Cuba in order to look into communist activities in Cuba. Arocena also denied ever taking part in terrorist actives in the United States, but did state that he was trained in the use of explosives by the C.I.A. in Florida. Arocena also stated that he once traveled Cuba, and releasing "germs" in the environment in order to start a chemical war between Cuba and the United States. In 2008, Arocena's wife Miriam led a campaign, which petitioned for the release of her husband. Miriam suggested that the life sentence her husband received was unwarranted given the nature and patriotic reasons of Eduardo Arocena's actions. Arocena was released on June 25, 2021, and died in September 2025.

=== Known attacks ===
On February 1, 1975, the group bombed the Venezuelan consulate in New York City. Arocena confessed to putting a hit out on Eulalio Jose Negrin who had negotiated with Cuba about the release of political prisoners. Arocena did not approve of any diplomatic negotiations with Cuba and therefore ordered Remon to kill Negrin. Remon completed the hit by murdering Negrin with a submachine gun in front of Negrin's teenage son.

On September 11, 1980, an attaché with the Cuban Permanent Mission to the United Nations, Felix Garcia Rodriguez, was fatally shot. He was driving back to the Cuban Mission along the Queens Boulevard service road near 58th Street in Queens, and was killed by a bullet fired from a parked car. Garcia was "the first United Nations official to have been assassinated in New York City since the founding of the world organization" in 1945.

During the indictment of Eduardo Arocena, Omega 7 was found guilty of at least seven bombings in the Miami, Florida area.

== See also ==
- Opposition to Fidel Castro
- Alpha 66
- Brigade 2506
- Coordination of United Revolutionary Organizations
- Cuban Five
- Cuba-United States relations
- Cuban Power
- JMWAVE
- Operation 40
- Operation Mongoose

== Bibliography ==
- Atkins, Stephen E. (1992). Terrorism: a reference handbook. Santa Barbara. Calif: ABC-CLIO. ISBN 0-87436-670-4.
