= Ann Louise Bardach =

American journalist and author

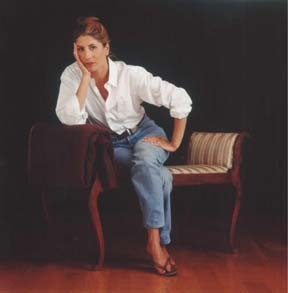
- Genres: journalism; non-fiction
- Notable awards: PEN USA Award for Journalism

Ann Louise Bardach is an American journalist and nonfiction author. Bardach is best known for her work on Cuba and Miami and was called "the go-to journalist on all things Cuban and Miami" by the Columbia Journalism Review, having interviewed dozens of key players including Fidel Castro, sister Juanita Castro, anti-Castro militant Luis Posada Carriles, CIA and Watergate plumber E. Howard Hunt, anti-Castro militant Orlando Bosch and CIA operative Felix Rodriguez, who was present for the assassination of Che Guevara.

Bardach's book Without Fidel: A Death Foretold in Miami, Havana and Washington was cited as a authoritative work on Cuba under the Castros and named one of The Miami Herald's "Ten Best Books of 2009." The pioneer of New Journalism Tom Wolfe described it as "news between hard covers by a relentless reporter who writes like a dream". Her book Cuba Confidential: Love and Vengeance in Miami and Havana was widely praised: Gay Talese described Bardach's work on Cuba as "fearless and gutsy - America's answer to Oriana Fallaci." Some of her journalism has been anthologized in KILLED: Journalism Too Hot To Print and In Mexico in Mind. Bardach was a Contributing Editor at Vanity Fair for ten years and has written for The New York Times, POLITICO, The Guardian, The Washington Post, The Atlantic, The Daily Beast, The Financial Times, The New Republic and the Los Angeles Times. She has appeared on numerous television programs including 60 Minutes, Today, Good Morning America, Dateline NBC, CNN, The O'Reilly Factor, Charlie Rose and has been frequently heard on NPR and the BBC. Bardach started the Global Buzz column for Newsweek International and created The Interrogation column for Slate.

== Early/Mid career ==
Starting out as a freelance crime reporter in New York City in the late 1970s, she lucked out by being at the Bellevue Morgue the week that the body of Sex Pistol Sid Vicious' girlfriend, Nancy Spungen arrived DOA; she wrote about this two weeks later in The SoHo Weekly News. Bardach's crime reporting includes a jailhouse confession of the first Manson murder, committed by Bobby Beausoleil, the Jon Benét Ramsey case for Vanity Fair (where she was the first to publish the ransom note), the murder of Vicki Morgan, Alfred Bloomingdale's mistress, and the 2010 murder of Hollywood publicist Ronni Chasen. Bardach chronicled the New York punk scene in the late 1970s-80s, conducting numerous interviews with musicians and personages from Debbie Harry of Blondie (in the New York Times Magazine), The Sex Pistols, artist Winston Tong, filmmaker Kenneth Anger, poet Jim Carroll, Klaus Nomi, the punk opera singer, etc.

In the mid 1990s, she began her research into Vivekananda, the 19th-century Indian Hindu monk and spiritual titan who introduced meditation to the West. In 2011–12, Bardach published articles about Vivekananda in the Sunday New York Times and The Wall Street Journal, with eventual plans for a biography.

== Awards ==
In 1995, Bardach won the PEN USA Award for Journalism for her reporting on Mexican politics; she was a PEN finalist in 1994 for her coverage of Islamic Fundamentalism's impact on women (both published in Vanity Fair). Her book Cuba Confidential was a finalist for the New York Public Library Helen Bernstein Award for Excellence in Journalism, the PEN USA Award for non-fiction, and named one of "Ten Best Books of 2002" by the Los Angeles Times. Bardach was a finalist for several awards for her reporting on bodybuilder/former gov. Arnold Schwarzenegger's extensive ties with David Pecker and the tabloid press published in Los Angeles magazine.

Bardach started the international journalism class at University of California, Santa Barbara (USCB) and is on the board of PEN USA and UCSB's Carsey-Wolf Center for Film, Television and New Media. She worked as a Resident Scholar at UCSB's Orfalea Center. She is also the editor of bilingual edition of The Prison Letters of Fidel Castro as well as Cuba: A Traveler's Literary Companion. She served on the Brookings Institution's Cuba Study Project.

== Books ==
- Vicki (St. Martins Press, 1986)
- Cuba: A Travelers Literary Companion (Whereabouts Press, 2002)
- Cuba Confidential: Love and Vengeance in Miami and Havana (Random House, 2002)
- Cuba Confidential: The Extraordinary Tragedy of Cuba, Its Revolution and Its Exiles (Penguin, 2004)
- Killed: Great Journalism Too Hot to Print (Nation Books, 2004)
- The Prison Letters of Fidel Castro: Cartas del Presidio (Avalon/Nation, 2007)
- Without Fidel: Death Foretold in Miami, Havana and Washington (Scribner, 2009)
