= Cuban American National Foundation =

Group opposed to current Cuban government

The Cuban American National Foundation is a foundation with the aim of assisting members of the Cuban community in Miami, Florida and opposing the current government in Cuba.

== Background and founding ==
The Cuban National American Foundation was founded in 1981 following the election of Ronald Reagan, when U.S. Republicans sought a lobbying organization made up of anti-Castro Cuban-Americans. The organization was molded after the pro-Israel organization AIPAC and enjoyed significant backing from the Reagan administration. In its early days, CANF also received "sizeable contributions" from board members who were "leaders of Miami's financial and import-export sector," running companies invested in Latin America and stood to gain from Reagan's policies that protected investment overseas. The first president of the organization was Jorge Mas Canosa, president of a construction company, and the first executive director was Frank Calzon, who had directed a Washington-based lobbying group. The organization had claimed to be non-partisan, but in practice its policy proposal were aligned with that of the Reagan government, including, for instance, its support for Radio Martí, an American state-run radio and television international broadcaster. CANF's support proved important in overcoming obstacles and passing the bill. Following this important early success, CANF also lobbied for other US foreign policy projects, including the invasion of Grenada and funding the anti-government rebels during the Angolan Civil War. It supported the Caribbean Basin Initiative of 1984.

CANF also operates the radio station La Voz de la Fundación which it attempts to transmit to Cuba; it led the effort to establish the U.S. Information Agency's Radio Martí (1985) and TV Martí (1990). Radio Martí and TV Martí are official U.S. broadcasting operations directed to the Cuban people.

In 1990 the group formed an "Information Commission", among its members were the brothers Guillermo and Ignacio Novo Sampol. In 1992 it held a $1,000-a-plate fundraising dinner attended by President George H. W. Bush.

Formerly a strong advocate for isolation of Cuba by the USA, in April 2009 CANF published an article calling for lifting US restrictions on aid and travel to Cuba, and aiding civil society groups there.

== History ==
The Cuban-born anti-Castro terrorist Luis Posada Carriles claimed in 1998 that he received financial support from CANF for a bombing campaign carried out in 1997, although he has denied ties with the attack. CANF has strongly denied Posada's statement, and Posada has since recanted his assertion. Gaspar Jiménez and Rolando Mendoza, ranking members of CANF, stepped down from leadership positions at the institution due to drug trafficking charges.

== See also ==
- Cuba–United States relations
- Ethnic interest groups in the United States
