= Operation 40 =

Secret CIA-sponsored intelligence group targeting Cuba

- Active: 1960–1972
- Country: United States of America; Cuba
- Branch: Central Intelligence Agency
- Type: Paramilitary force Guerilla warfare organization
- Role: Black ops Sabotage; Targeted killing Covert operations Guerilla warfare Asymmetric warfare Espionage; Counter-intelligence
- Engagements: Bay of Pigs Invasion

Commanders
- Director of the Central Intelligence Agency: Allen W. Dulles
- Vice President of the United States: Richard M. Nixon
- Chief of Naval Operations: Arleigh Burke
- National Security Advisor: Gordon Gray
- Secretary of State: Livingston T. Merchant

Operation 40 was the code name for a top-secret Central Intelligence Agency-sponsored counterintelligence and counterinsurgency group composed of CIA officers and anti-Castro Cuban exiles. The group was established in 1960 to target the new communist regime in Cuba, and it participated in the planning and execution of the Bay of Pigs Invasion. If the invasion had proved successful, the group would have aided in forming a right-wing government while purging Castro supporters and other left dissidents. In the 1960s, Operation 40 continued to function unofficially in Florida as a counterintelligence unit. It was disbanded in the early 1970s due to allegations that Operation 40 personnel were involved in cocaine and heroin smuggling.

== Origins ==
On 11 December 1959, Colonel J.C. King, head of the CIA's Western Hemisphere Division, sent a confidential memorandum to CIA Director Allen W. Dulles. King argued that after the recent Cuban Revolution, there now existed a nearby "far-left" dictatorship "which, if permitted to stand, will encourage similar actions against U.S. holdings in other Latin American countries." One of King's four recommendations was:

Thorough consideration be given to the elimination of Fidel Castro. None of those close of Fidel, such as his brother Raul or his companion Che Guevara, have the same mesmeric appeal to the masses. Many informed people believe that the disappearance of Fidel would greatly accelerate the fall of the present Government.

Dulles forwarded King's memo to the National Security Council, which approved the formation of a working group to devise "alternative solutions to the Cuban problem." Operation 40 was subsequently created under the leadership of José Sanjenís Perdomo. It was given that name because originally there were 40 agents involved, though it later expanded to more than 70.

At a White House meeting on 17 March 1960, a plan entitled "A Program of Covert Action Against the Castro Regime" was presented to President Dwight Eisenhower. Among the meeting's attendees were Vice President Richard Nixon, Admiral Arleigh Burke, Secretary of State Christian Herter, CIA Director Dulles, CIA Deputy Director for Plans Richard Bissell, and J.C. King. The plan called for a broad range of intelligence, political, paramilitary, and psychological warfare operations to topple Cuba's communist government. Eisenhower authorized the covert action program and stressed the need for its deniability. Although not mentioned in the program, Operation 40 was tasked with sabotaging Cuban infrastructure as well as assassinating Cuban leaders. Once Castro was overthrown, Operation 40 would have formed the nucleus of a "Cuban CIA" to purge any remaining Castro supporters along with other leftist elements.

== Operations ==
Operation 40 consisted of Cuban exiles—many of whom had served in the Bureau for the Repression of Communist Activities under Fulgencio Batista—joined by a small number of American CIA agents. In addition to its members focused on setting up a new Cuban government, Operation 40 also had an assassination unit. One Operation 40 participant, Watergate burglar Frank Sturgis, told author Michael Canfield in a 1975 interview:

[T]he assassination section, which I was a part of...would upon orders, naturally, assassinate either members of the military or the political parties of the foreign country that you were going to infiltrate, and if necessary some of your own members who were suspected of being foreign agents.

Although Operation 40 mainly operated in Cuba, it conducted similar activities in other Latin American countries. The "black ops" perpetrated by Operation 40 were intent on destabilizing the Cuban Revolutionary Government. For example, on 4 March 1960, a ship flying a Belgian flag exploded in Havana Bay. According to Cuban intelligence official Fabián Escalante:

[The ship] was loaded with arms and ammunition destined for the defense of the revolution. The act was a CIA operation carried out by various saboteurs who boarded the ship in its port of origin and placed explosives which were detonated by a device which responded to the change in pressure when the cargo was being unloaded. Seventy-five persons were killed and more than 200 injured.

While these sabotage operations were occurring in 1960, another CIA-sponsored group of Cuban exiles known as Brigade 2506 was being equipped and trained in Guatemala for an upcoming invasion of Cuba. Operation 40 was eventually attached to the invasion. Prior to the invasion, Operation 40 reportedly purged Brigade 2506 (under the orders of Manuel Artime and E. Howard Hunt) of any liberal, left, or otherwise anti-Batista members. Once Brigade 2506 conquered Cuban towns and villages, Operation 40 would have been charged with cleansing those areas of "hard-core Fidelistas" along with supporters of Cuban exile Manuel Ray Rivero. Afterwards, the group would help establish a new right-wing government, possibly under Artime.

On 17 April 1961, Operation 40 members landed at the Bay of Pigs via the CIA-chartered freighter Atlántico. One member, Vicente León León, was killed in action with the rest taken prisoner. Operation 40 survivors were trained to keep their group a secret. However, when Brigade 2506 intelligence officer José Raúl Varona González was captured and interrogated, he revealed Operation 40's existence to Cuban officials. After the invasion, the group ceased its foreign operations.

During the mid-to-late 1960s, Operation 40 unofficially served as a counterintelligence unit, primarily active in Florida, and still under Jose Sanjenís's leadership. The group largely spied on Cuban exiles and any Americans who associated with them, in the hopes of rooting out potential spies working in the U.S. on behalf of the Cuban government. Although no such spies were found, Operation 40 gathered extensive files on prominent Cuban exiles.

== Demise ==
Operation 40's activities began winding down as a result of a small plane crash in Southern California in the late 1960s. The plane was allegedly piloted by one of Jose Sanjenís's men. In the wreckage, the police found several kilograms of cocaine and heroin. Soon after the crash, the group was further reduced when another Cuban in the group, accused by U.S. federal authorities of being a cocaine smuggler, was killed in a gun battle with Miami police. By 1970, the Operation 40 team had dwindled to only a few men who mainly worked on updating existing files. Sanjenís retired from the CIA in 1972, with Operation 40 being disbanded by the CIA around the same time.

== See also ==
- Brigade 2506
- Assassination attempts on Fidel Castro
- Richard M. Bissell, Jr.
- Cuban Power
- Cuban Project
- Guillermo Hernández-Cartaya

== Bibliography ==
- Bohning, Don. 2005. The Castro Obsession: U.S. Covert Operations Against Cuba, 1959–1965. p. 303 ISBN 1-57488-676-2
