= Alpha 66 =

Anti-Castro paramilitary organization

- Founder: Antonio Veciana
- Leader: Andrés Nazario Sargen (deceased)
- Dates active: 1961–2004
- Country: United States
- Allegiance: Cuban opposition
- Headquarters: Miami, Florida, U.S.
- Active regions: Florida, Cuba
- Ideology: Conservatism; Ultranationalism; Anti-Castroism; Anti-communism
- Political position: Far-right

Alpha 66 was an anti-Castro paramilitary organization. The group was originally formed by Cuban exiles in the early 1960s and was most active in the late 1970s and 1980s. Its activities declined in the 1980s.

== History ==
=== Foundation ===
Alpha 66 was founded by Cuban exiles in the early 1960s to act as an anti-Castro, paramilitary group. Although it has undergone changes in personnel and leadership, it still exists today and is based out of Florida. Alpha 66 was most active during the late 1970s and early 1980s, but remains active in the Miami area. At the height of its power, Alpha 66 operated at a level similar to Abdala, Brigade 2506, Omega 7, and the FLNC (Cuban National Liberation Front) amongst other Cuban-exile paramilitary groups. It claimed to have sixty-three chapters in operation during 1977.

Like other paramilitary groups composed of Cuban exiles who emigrated after the fall of the Batista regime, Alpha 66 presented itself as a conservative, ultra-nationalistic, patriotic organization that wished to undo Fidel Castro's revolutionary government. Alpha 66's founding members included many Cubans who had fought as revolutionaries against the Batista government alongside Fidel Castro, and Alpha 66's anthem directly references Fidel Castro as having betrayed the ideals that the group's members originally fought for. Alpha 66's anti-communist rhetoric and staunch opposition to the Cuban government earned it the overwhelming support of the Miami exile community as well as the sympathy of an overtly anti-communist attitude in American politics.

Alpha 66 had multiple founders including Eloy Gutiérrez Menoyo, who had served twenty years in a Cuban prison for counterrevolutionary activities, and Antonio Veciana. Early on, some members of Alpha 66 also partook in the United States-sponsored Volunteer Program, which allowed Cuban exiles to form all-Cuban military units within the United States Army. A 1964 FBI memo confirmed that Veciana, Menoyo and Andrés Nazario Sargen were all assets of US Army intelligence. Additionally, members of Alpha 66 received limited funding and training from the CIA; however, this support did not last. The CIA found that it had little control over the actions of Alpha 66 and, in many cases, Alpha 66 carried out operations without the CIA's approval or consultation, leading to the CIA ending its involvement with the group, which in turn caused many Alpha 66 members to become disillusioned with the United States government for its lack of support. Despite the lack of government support, Alpha 66 still managed to train its members throughout the everglades of Florida.

In January 1963 Veciana made a speech at a fundraising event in San Juan, Puerto Rico. He announced that Alpha 66 would lead a "war of liberation" and singled out the "pacifist" Kennedy administration which he said was seeking rapprochement with the Cuban government. He cautioned against seeking aid from the US government as "useless" because "U.S. policy on the Cuban situation is not cooperative".

On 17 March 1963 Alpha 66, in coordination with the Second National Front of the Escambray, attacked the Soviet freighter the Lvov while it was anchored at Isabela de Sagua harbor. The ship was successfully hit with a cannon and then strafed with machine guns. The USSR made a formal diplomatic complaint to the U.S. Embassy in protest and on 3 April the Russian ambassador Andrei Gromyko met with US ambassador Foy D. Kohler to complain. This raid and others by Cuban exiles was condemned by the Kennedy administration, considering it provocative and pointless.

=== Evolution ===
As hope for a United States-led invasion of Cuba died down amongst exiles, a growing number of Cuban exiles began to promote reconciliation between the United States and Cuba as well as peaceful methods of change within Cuba. In Alpha 66's case, some members broke off and started a group known as Cambio Cubano (Cuban Change). Notably, Gutierrez Menoyo and Antonio Veciana became strong advocates for national dialogue between Cuba and the United States. By 1974, most Cuban exiles figured that the Cuban government could not be overthrown by a militant group and instead decided to support cooperation between the United States and Cuba. The Cuban exiles were labeled “dialogueros” as opposed to the “hardliners” who still wished to overthrow Cuba's communist regime and the Castro government by force. One Miami Herald poll found that only twenty-eight percent of the Cuban exile population in the area supported dialogue between the United States and the Castro government.

Although the United States was originally unable to halt Alpha 66's terrorist operations due to issues arising between United States Customs and the Department of Justice, there were other reasons for its lack of action on the issue of Alpha 66. At the time of Alpha 66's founding, the United States was committed to overthrowing Fidel Castro's communist government, which further complicated the efforts of the United States to stop Alpha 66's activities because both actors were momentarily aligned in their goal. However, as time passed, and tensions eased between the United States and Cuba, the United States government began to specifically target paramilitary exile groups and other terrorist cells, making clear its lack of support for the illegal activities that many militants attempted to undertake. By the 1980s, the United States organized special task forces to further crack down on the terrorist activities of groups like Alpha 66. This, and the growing support for the “dialogueros” movement, led most Cuban exile paramilitary organizations to breakup by the mid 1980s.

=== Contemporary ===
Although Alpha 66's power began to wane in the early 1980s, it never formally disbanded, As late as 1995, Alpha 66 members claimed to be launching "drive-by" attacks on Cuban tourist beaches. The Miami area is home to some of the last active Alpha 66 cells. There are many Alpha 66 websites in operation today, however; most are old and have not been updated since the 1990s or early 2000s. Alpha 66's doctrine of violent change in Cuba has largely been overturned in favor a peaceful reforms and coexistence between the Cuban government and Cuban exiles. Alpha 66 has no official sponsor, nor is there an official figurehead for the group. The end of the Cold War, death of Fidel Castro, and warming of relations between the United States and Cuba has made Alpha 66's reason for existing largely nonexistent, especially when paired with the change in popular opinion as to how to bring about change in Cuba.

== See also ==
- Cuban Power
- Omega 7
