= 2025 Leagues Cup final =

Soccer match in Seattle, Washington, US

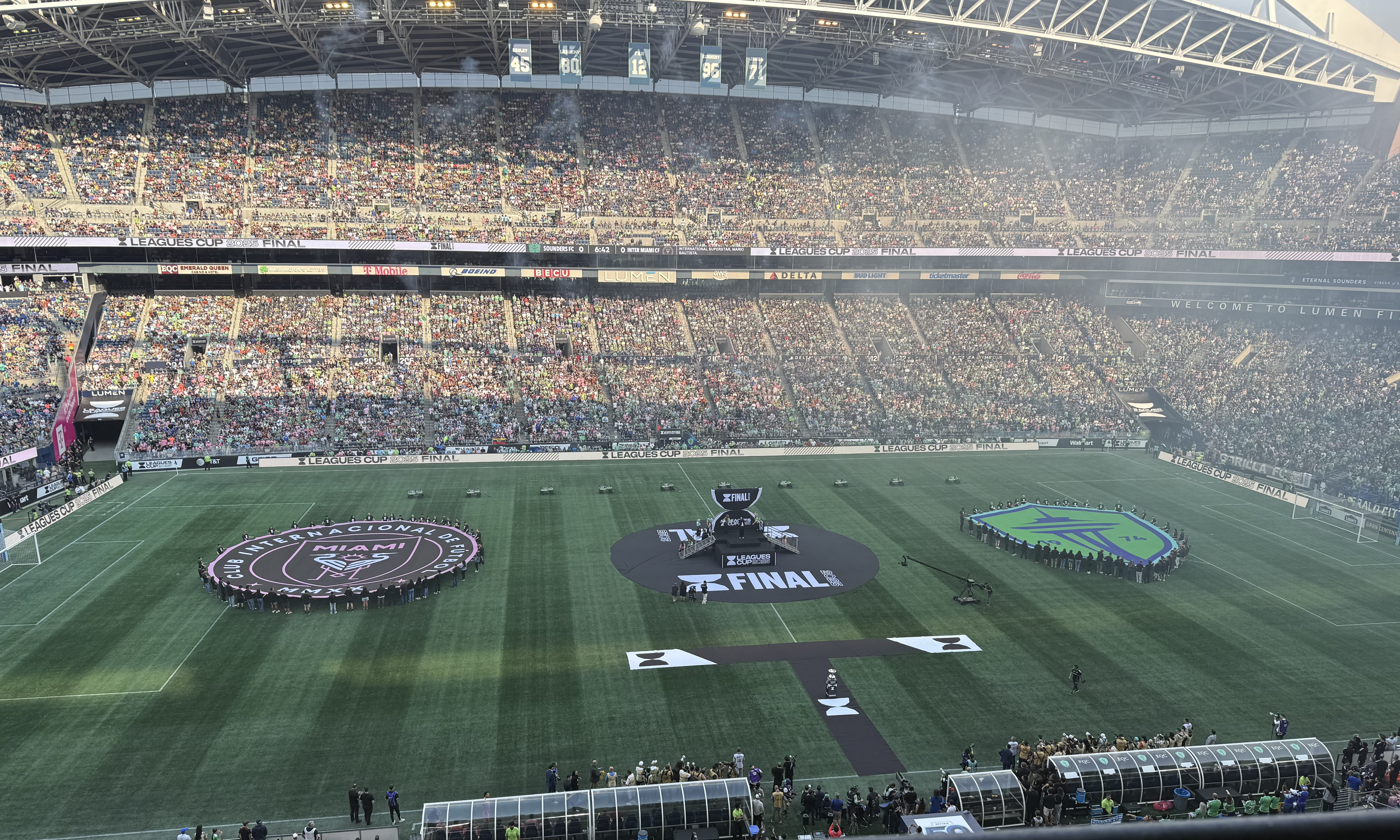
- Lumen Field during the pregame ceremonies
- Event: 2025 Leagues Cup
Seattle Sounders FC	Inter Miami CF
(United States)	(United States)
3	0
- Date: August 31, 2025
- Venue: Lumen Field, Seattle, Washington, U.S.
- Man of the Match: Alex Roldán (Seattle Sounders FC)
- Referee: Juan Gabriel Calderón (Costa Rica)
- Attendance: 69,314
- Weather: Sunny, 77 °F (25 °C)

The 2025 Leagues Cup final was the deciding match of the fifth edition of the Leagues Cup, a soccer tournament played between clubs from Major League Soccer (MLS) and Liga MX. The match was played on August 31, 2025, at Lumen Field in Seattle, Washington, United States, by host Seattle Sounders FC and Inter Miami CF. Both teams were in their second Leagues Cup final; Seattle finished as runners-up in the 2021 edition, while Miami won the 2023 final. It was the second-ever match played between the two teams, who were already scheduled for a regular match in September 2025. The 2025 final was the third consecutive Leagues Cup final to only feature MLS teams.

Seattle Sounders FC won the match 3–0 for their first Leagues Cup title. Defender Alex Roldán won man of the match honors for his goal and two assists. The match was attended by 69,314 spectators, a record for the Leagues Cup and Lumen Field. The post-match celebrations were delayed by a fight between players and staff instigated by Inter Miami CF that later resulted in suspensions.

== Road to the final ==
The Leagues Cup is an annual international tournament between clubs from Major League Soccer (MLS), the top flight soccer league in the United States and Canada, and Liga MX, the top flight league in Mexico. It is hosted entirely in the United States and Canada during the middle of the MLS regular season. The top three teams qualify for the CONCACAF Champions Cup, the premier continental club championship in the region. Unlike other soccer tournaments, the Leagues Cup has no draws or extra time; a tied match at the end of regulation time immediately proceeded to a penalty shootout to determine the winner.

The fifth edition of the competition was contested by 36 teams—18 from each league—in a smaller format than previous years that included all MLS teams. The MLS entrants were limited to the participants from the 2024 MLS Cup playoffs, with the exception of Vancouver Whitecaps FC after they were replaced by expansion team San Diego FC. Each team played in three inter-league matches in the first round, named the "league phase", played over a short break in the regular seasons for both leagues. The four teams from each league's table with the most points qualified for the knockout stage, which began with the quarterfinals round that was played as the regular season resumed. The quarterfinals retained the inter-league matchups through seeding, but later rounds for intra-league matches. The defending champions were the Columbus Crew, who were eliminated in the league phase.

Both of the finalists, Seattle Sounders FC and Inter Miami CF, had previously appeared in the Leagues Cup final. Seattle were defeated by Club León in the 2021 final, while Miami won the 2023 final against Nashville SC. Seattle and Miami were also among the three MLS participants in the 2025 FIFA Club World Cup. The two teams had only played one previous match in 2022, but were already scheduled for an MLS regular season match in September 2025. Every Liga MX team were eliminated by the quarterfinals, leaving only MLS teams to play in the final for the third consecutive year.

=== Seattle Sounders FC ===
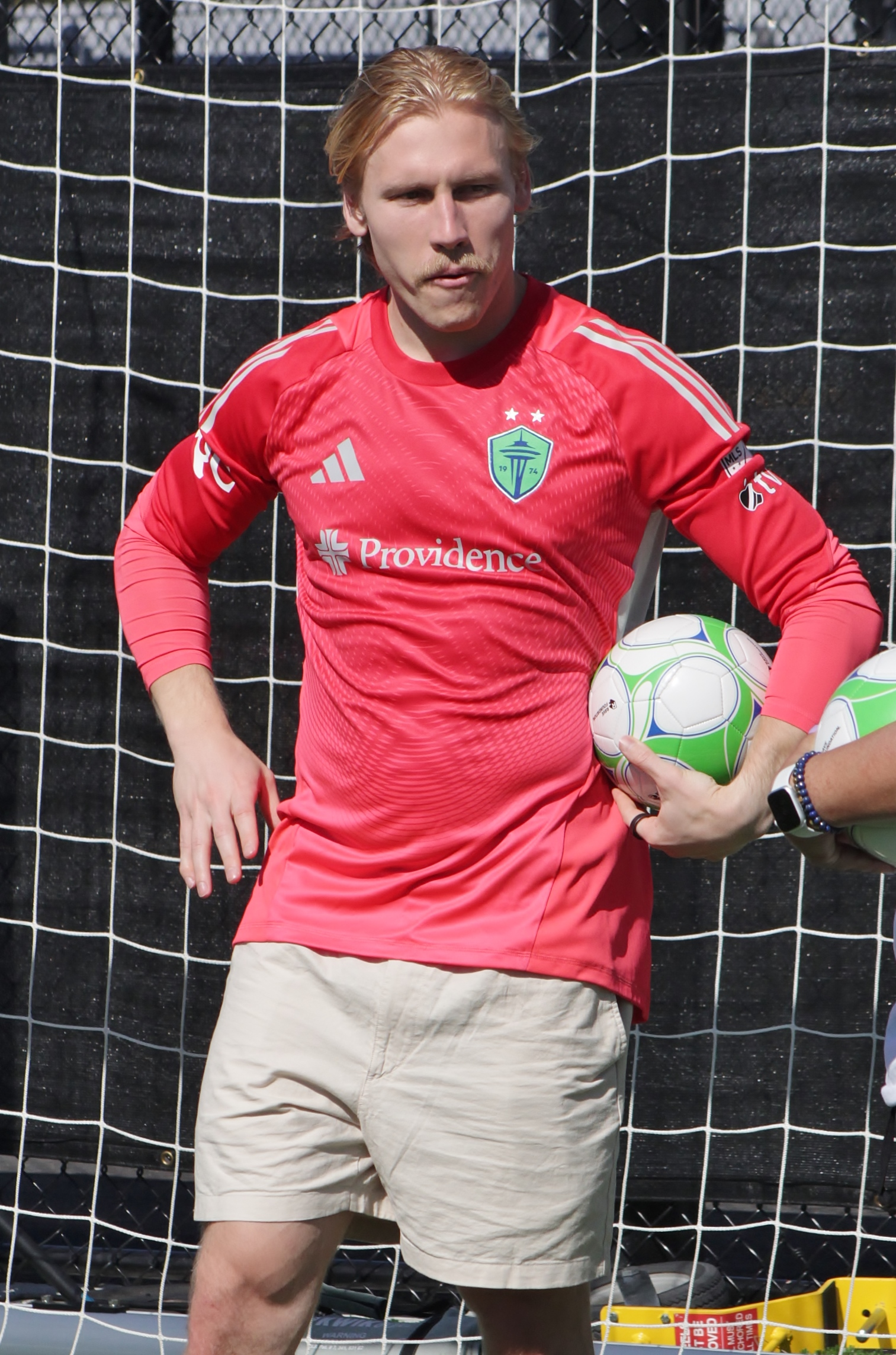
Backup goalkeeper Andrew Thomas played in all six Leagues Cup matches

Seattle Sounders FC entered MLS as an expansion team in 2009 and have won a total of eight major trophies and titles: two MLS Cups, four U.S. Open Cups, one Supporters' Shield, and the 2022 CONCACAF Champions League. The team finished as runners-up in the Leagues Cup in 2021 and reached the quarterfinals under the expanded format in 2024. The Leagues Cup was the last remaining North American competition that the Sounders had not won. Seattle were eliminated from the 2024 MLS Cup playoffs in the Western Conference Final by the LA Galaxy, who eventually won the title. After they participated in the 2025 FIFA Club World Cup, the Sounders entered the Leagues Cup with nine unbeaten matches in regular season play but also lost key goalscorers Jordan Morris and Albert Rusnák to injuries.

The Sounders were the only team to win all three matches in the league phase and finished atop the MLS table. They defeated Cruz Azul 7–0 in the opening match, setting a record for the largest margin of victory for an MLS team against a Liga MX opponent. All seven goals were scored during the second half; Pedro de la Vega, who entered as a substitute in the 73rd minute, scored two goals for Seattle. The Sounders won 2–1 in their match against Santos Laguna, with the winning goal scored by winger Georgi Minoungou shortly before he was ejected for a second yellow card during his celebration. Seattle finished the league phase with a 2–1 defeat of Club Tijuana in the third matchday after they had conceded in the first half's stoppage time. Osaze De Rosario scored the equalizer with a header and was followed by Danny Musovski's header off a corner kick in the 87th minute to win the match.

Seattle played to a scoreless draw against Club Puebla in the quarterfinals and won 4–3 in the penalty shootout, during which Andrew Thomas made two saves. Thomas, the team's backup goalkeeper, was chosen to start through the tournament while primary goalkeeper Stefan Frei recovered from an earlier concussion. Striker Danny Musovski had been sent off in the 76th minute for touching the referee and later received a suspension for the rest of the tournament. The Sounders qualified for the Leagues Cup final with a 2–0 win against the LA Galaxy, who hosted the semifinal due to their seeding as MLS Cup 2024 champions. De la Vega scored in the seventh minute; De Rosario's goal in the second half was scored after dribbling through several Galaxy defenders in the box. Sounders defender Nouhou was sent off for a tackle on Gabriel Pec after a video assistant referee review near the end of the match.

=== Inter Miami CF ===
Since entering MLS in 2020, Inter Miami CF have won a Supporters' Shield and the 2023 Leagues Cup. The team gained interaction recognition after signing Lionel Messi, Luis Suárez, and several other European stars in 2023 and 2024. They became the first MLS team to advance to the knockout stage of the Club World Cup and defeated a European club in the group stage. During the summer transfer window, Miami also acquired midfielder Rodrigo De Paul on loan from Atlético Madrid and expected him to debut in the Leagues Cup.

Miami opened the tournament against Atlas and won 2–1 with two close-range goals that were assisted by Lionel Messi. Telasco Segovia scored their first goal in the 58th minute, while the winning goal from Marcelo Weigandt came in stoppage time. Messi injured his right thigh after a fall in the 11th minute of the next match against Club Necaxa, which was followed by a Segovia goal in the next minute. Maximiliano Falcón was sent off with a red card in the 17th minute after a challenge on Diber Cambindo; Miami manager Javier Mascherano responded with a defensive substitution to protect the 1–0. The team conceded two goals to Necaxa, who also lost a player to a red card, but Jordi Alba's header in stoppage time brought the match to a 2–2 tie in regulation time. The ensuing penalty shootout was won 5–4 by Miami after a save by Rocco Ríos Novo, which earned the team two points in the standings table. In their final group phase match, Miami defeated Pumas UNAM 3–1 with goals from Suárez's goal and two assists to De Paul and Tadeo Allende after the team initially conceded. Miami finished second in the MLS table during the league phase with eight points.

In the quarterfinals against Tigres UANL, Suárez scored from two penalty kicks to lead Miami to a 2–1 victory. Both penalties were awarded due to handballs in the penalty area—the first in the 23rd minute and the second in the 89th. Mascherano was sent off at half-time and suspended one match for arguing with referees and was later accused of contacting assistant coaches on his cell phone. Miami hosted their inter-state rivals, Orlando City SC, in the semifinals and won 3–1 to advance to their second Leagues Cup final. Orlando took the lead before half-time through a goal from Marco Pašalić, but defender David Brekalo conceded a penalty kick and was sent off with his second yellow card for a foul in the 75th minute. Messi, who had returned from his injury, converted the penalty kick and scored from inside the box in the 88th minute. Segovia scored the final goal of the match in stoppage time. Orlando City later filed an official complaint regarding the officiating to the Leagues Cup Organizing Committee due to the red cards to Brekalo and later Robin Jansson; coach Óscar Pareja also criticized the lack of a penalty kick for a foul by Miami's Sergio Busquets in the second half.

=== Summary of results ===
Note: In all results below, the score of the finalist is given first (H: home; A: away). All matches were decided through a penalty shootout (p) if scores were tied after regulation time.

(United States) Seattle Sounders FC		Round	(United States) Inter Miami CF	
Opponent	Result	League phase	Opponent	Result
(Mexico) Cruz Azul	7–0 (H)	Matchday 1	(Mexico) Atlas	2–1 (H)
(Mexico) Santos Laguna	2–1 (H)	Matchday 2	(Mexico) Necaxa	2–2 (5–4 p) (H)
(Mexico) Tijuana	2–1 (H)	Matchday 3	(Mexico) Pumas UNAM	3–1 (H)
1st place in MLS bracket: Pos / Team / Pld / Pts; 1 / Seattle Sounders FC / 3 / 9; 2 / Inter Miami CF / 3 / 8; 3 / LA Galaxy / 3 / 7; 4 / Orlando City SC / 3 / 7; 5 / Portland Timbers / 3 / 7; Source: Leagues Cup		Final standings	2nd place in MLS bracket: Pos / Team / Pld / Pts; 1 / Seattle Sounders FC / 3 / 9; 2 / Inter Miami CF / 3 / 8; 3 / LA Galaxy / 3 / 7; 4 / Orlando City SC / 3 / 7; 5 / Portland Timbers / 3 / 7; Source: Leagues Cup	
Opponent	Result	Knockout stage	Opponent	Result
(Mexico) Puebla	0–0 (4–3 p) (H)	Quarterfinals	(Mexico) Tigres UANL	2–1 (H)
(United States) LA Galaxy	2–0 (A)	Semifinals	(United States) Orlando City SC	3–1 (H)

== Venue ==
The Leagues Cup final was played at Lumen Field, the home stadium of the Sounders. It is a multi-purpose venue with 69,000 seats and is also used by Seattle Reign FC of the National Women's Soccer League and the Seattle Seahawks of the National Football League. The stadium hosted the MLS Cup final in 2009 as a neutral site and in 2019 with the Sounders as a finalist. It also hosted the second leg of the 2022 CONCACAF Champions League final and several matches during the 2025 FIFA Club World Cup. For the Leagues Cup final, the Sounders opened additional seating areas in anticipation of high demand for tickets. By August 30, the team had sold over 60,000 tickets. The match had a total attendance of 69,314 spectators, setting a new record for the Leagues Cup and surpassing the previous record for a sporting event at Lumen Field that was set by the Sounders at MLS Cup 2019.

== Broadcasting ==
The final was broadcast globally with English and Spanish commentary on MLS Season Pass, an online streaming service operated by the league and Apple under the Apple TV+ platform. Play-by-play commentator Jake Zivin and analyst Taylor Twellman led the English broadcast, while Diego Valeri and Sammy Sadovnik were on the call for the Spanish broadcast. A television broadcast on Univision and TUDN used a separate Spanish commentary team. The match was also transmitted nationally in English on SiriusXM FC, a satellite channel. In the Seattle area, the match's radio broadcast was in English on KJR-FM and Spanish on El Rey KKMO.

== Match ==
=== Details ===
August 31, 2025
5:00 p.m. PDT

Seattle Sounders FC (United States)	3–0	(United States) Inter Miami CF
De Rosario 26'; A. Roldán 84' (pen.); Rothrock 89'	Report

Lumen Field, Seattle, Washington
Attendance: 69,314
Referee: Juan Gabriel Calderón (Costa Rica)

Seattle Sounders FC	Inter Miami CF

GK	26	(United States) Andrew Thomas
RB	16	(El Salvador) Alex Roldán
CB	28	(Colombia) Yeimar Gómez Andrade
CB	25	(United States) Jackson Ragen
LB	21	(United States) Reed Baker-Whiting
CM	18	(Mexico) Obed Vargas
CM	7	(United States) Cristian Roldan (c)
RW	14	(United States) Paul Rothrock	(substituted off) 90+1'
AM	9	(United States) Jesús Ferreira	(substituted off) 78'
LW	10	(Argentina) Pedro de la Vega	(substituted off) 61'
CF	95	(Guyana) Osaze De Rosario	(substituted off) 61'
Substitutes:
GK	24	(Switzerland) Stefan Frei
GK	29	(United States) Jacob Castro
DF	3	(United States) Travian Sousa
DF	15	(Jamaica) Jon Bell
DF	20	(South Korea) Kim Kee-hee	(substituted on) 90+1'
DF	33	(United States) Cody Baker
DF	85	(United States) Kalani Kossa-Rienzi	(substituted on) 61'
MF	11	(Slovakia) Albert Rusnák
MF	37	(United States) Snyder Brunell
MF	75	(United States) Danny Leyva	(substituted on) 61'
MF	93	(Ivory Coast) Georgi Minoungou	(substituted on) 78'
Manager:
(United States) Brian Schmetzer

GK	19	(Argentina) Oscar Ustari
RB	17	(Jamaica) Ian Fray		(substituted off) 72'
CB	37	(Uruguay) Maximiliano Falcón
CB	2	(Argentina) Gonzalo Luján		(substituted off) 57'
LB	18	(Spain) Jordi Alba
RM	7	(Argentina) Rodrigo De Paul
CM	42	(Italy) Yannick Bright	(yellow card) 82'	(substituted off) 85'
CM	5	(Spain) Sergio Busquets	(yellow card) 69'
LM	21	(Argentina) Tadeo Allende
CF	10	(Argentina) Lionel Messi (c)
CF	9	(Uruguay) Luis Suárez
Substitutes:
GK	25	(United States) William Yarbrough
GK	34	(Argentina) Rocco Ríos Novo
DF	6	(Argentina) Tomás Avilés
DF	15	(United States) Ryan Sailor
DF	32	(Greece) Noah Allen
DF	57	(Argentina) Marcelo Weigandt
MF	8	(Venezuela) Telasco Segovia		(substituted on) 57'
MF	11	(Argentina) Baltasar Rodríguez
MF	30	(United States) Benjamin Cremaschi		(substituted on) 85'
MF	41	(Honduras) David Ruiz
MF	81	(United States) Santiago Morales
FW	14	(Haiti) Fafà Picault		(substituted on) 72'
Manager:
(Argentina) Javier Mascherano

Man of the Match:
Alex Roldán (Seattle Sounders FC)

Assistant referees:
Juan Mora (Costa Rica)
William Arrieta (Costa Rica)
Fourth official:
Joe Dickerson (United States)
Video assistant referee:
Érick Miranda (Mexico)
Assistant video assistant referee:
Allen Chapman (United States)

Match rules

- 90 minutes
- Penalty shoot-out if scores level
- Maximum of twelve named substitutes
- Maximum of five substitutions
- Maximum of three substitution opportunities

== Post-match ==
After the conclusion of the match, a number of Miami players appeared to incite a physical confrontation that devolved into a melee. Miami forward Luis Suárez (who has a notable history of on-pitch violent conduct) appeared to begin the episode when he put Seattle midfielder Obed Vargas in a headlock while the latter celebrated with Cody Baker. Seattle defender Yeimar Gómez Andrade disengaged the headlock, at which point Sergio Busquets (who had already been given a yellow card in the 69th minute of the match) appeared to punch Vargas in the chin. Miami defender Maximiliano Falcón pulled Baker away from Busquets and then put the former in a headlock, which Gómez attempted to prevent. Staff from both teams attempted to intervene and restore order.

Suárez then engaged in a verbal altercation with Sounders security director Gene Ramirez, after which he stepped on the latter's foot and spit on him. Miami goalkeeper Oscar Ustari stepped in between them to prevent any further altercation. In another part of the melee, Miami players Marcelo Weigandt and Tomás Avilés appeared to physically confront Seattle defender Jackson Ragen.

Tensions were eventually defused, and the trophy ceremony proceeded with both teams in attendance. In a press interaction, Miami coach Javier Mascherano appeared to disown responsibility for the episode, and hinted at his players being provoked. Public and press reaction was critical of the Miami players and organization. Seattle coach Brian Schmetzer was complimentary of Messi and Miami part-owner David Beckham for their conduct after the match. The next day, a spokesperson for the Leagues Cup said that the Organizing Committee was reviewing the incident; the MLS had not commented.

On September 5, 2025, the Leagues Cup Organizing Committee announced suspensions for players and staff involved in the fight. Suárez was suspended for six matches, Busquets for two matches, Avilés for three matches, and Sounders assistant Steven Lenhart for five matches, all four individuals also received fines. The suspensions are to be served in future editions of the Leagues Cup, beginning in 2026. On September 8, MLS suspended Suárez for three matches, and revoked Lenhart's credential privileges for the remainder of the 2025 season (including postseason). The league also fined the Sounders for "misappropriation of credentials"; Busquets and Avilés did not receive further punishment.
