= 2025 Inter Miami CF season =

Inter Miami CF
2025 season
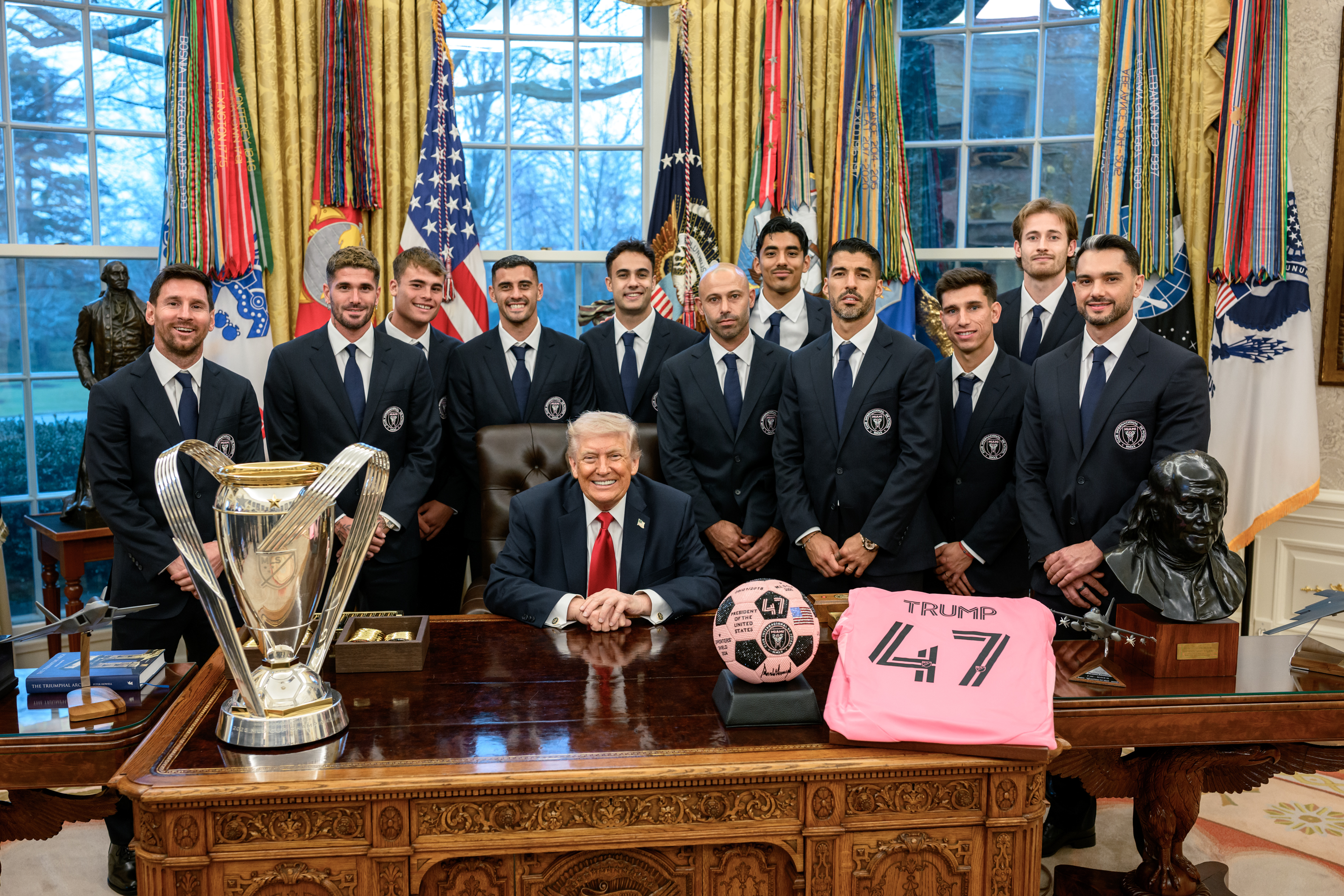
- Inter Miami with U.S. president Donald Trump at the White House in March 2026 following their MLS Cup victory
- President: David Beckham
- Head coach: Javier Mascherano
- Stadium: Chase Stadium
- Major League Soccer: Conference: 3rd Overall: 3rd
- MLS Cup playoffs: Winners
- CONCACAF Champions Cup: Semifinals
- FIFA Club World Cup: Round of 16
- Leagues Cup: Runners-up
- Top goalscorer: League: Lionel Messi (29); All: Lionel Messi (43)
- Highest home attendance: 21,550 vs. New England (Oct. 4)
- Lowest home attendance: 16,888 vs. Atlanta (Oct. 11)
- Average home league attendance: 20,410
Home colors	Away colors	Third colors

The 2025 season was the sixth season for Inter Miami CF, a professional soccer team based in Miami, Florida, United States. The team played in Major League Soccer (MLS), the top flight of club soccer in the United States, as a member of the Eastern Conference. The year also marked the 22nd season of first-division club soccer in South Florida. In addition to playing in the MLS regular season, Inter Miami CF competed in the CONCACAF Champions Cup for the second time, and played in the FIFA Club World Cup for the first time.

The club were the defending Supporters' Shield champions, having set a record for most points in MLS history during the 2024 regular season. They qualified for the FIFA Club World Cup in the allocated slot for the host country and hosted the expanded tournament's opening match on June 15, 2025, at Hard Rock Stadium in Miami Gardens, Florida. The 2025 season was the final year for the club at Chase Stadium in Fort Lauderdale, which was replaced by Nu Stadium in 2026.

Inter Miami CF ended the season with their first MLS Cup title after they defeated Vancouver Whitecaps FC 3–1 in the final played at Chase Stadium.

== Summary ==
=== Preseason ===
Argentinian manager Gerardo "Tata" Martino resigned at the end of the 2024 season after two years at the club and was replaced on November 26 by Javier Mascherano, the former manager of the Argentina under-20 team. Sporting director Chris Henderson left Miami in December to join Atlanta United FC. The team's captain, Argentinian midfielder Lionel Messi, has a contract through the end of the 2025 season. The team had several key players who had contracts that were set to expire during the 2024–25 offseason, including striker Luis Suárez and defender Jordi Alba, who had a club option for 2025. Suárez signed a one-year extension of his contract on November 27 and was followed by the exercising of a contract option for Alba through the 2025 season.

The preseason for Inter Miami CF began on January 10 with players reporting to a training camp that expended to full sessions three days later. The team played their first friendly match ten days later against Club América of Liga MX at Allegiant Stadium in the Las Vegas area. The teams drew 2–2 in regulation time and Inter Miami CF won 3–2 in the penalty shootout, which culminated in a winning kick by 17-year-old homegrown player Santiago Morales. Inter Miami CF then played in three overseas friendlies organized by marketing agency Never Say Never (co-founded by Andrés Iniesta) before returning to the United States in February. Inter Miami CF and Orlando City SC played a preseason friendly match on February 14 at Raymond James Stadium; it was the first match at the stadium with MLS teams since the Tampa Bay Mutiny folded in 2001.

=== February and March ===
Miami began their season with the first round of the CONCACAF Champions Cup. The first leg was hosted by Sporting Kansas City and originally scheduled for February 18, but was moved a day later due to a winter storm warning. The match kicked off on February 19 with a temperature of 5 °F (−15 °C); by the end of the match, the temperature was below 0 °F (−18 °C). Lionel Messi scored the lone goal of the match in the 56th minute as both teams had difficulty playing in the cold conditions. The match's referee, Marco Ortíz of Mexico, was later suspended by CONCACAF for requesting an autograph from Messi for a family member.

The team returned to Florida three days later to open the MLS regular season against New York City FC; the scheduled kickoff time was delayed by five hours to accommodate the earlier change in the CONCACAF Champions Cup fixture. Messi had two assists in the match, which finished in a 2–2 draw after a late tying goal for Miami in the tenth minute of stoppage time by Telasco Segovia. Miami had played for most of the match with 10 players after defender Tomás Avilés was sent off for a tackle in the 23rd minute. Miami advanced to the round of 16 in the Champions Cup with a 3–1 win at home against Sporting Kansas City in the second leg of their series, which finished with a 4–1 aggregate score. All three goals for the home team were scored in the first half, including two in stoppage time. Lionel Messi did not travel for Miami's away league match against the Houston Dynamo, who allowed fans in attendance to claim a complimentary ticket for a future match. Miami won 4–1 with a goal and three assists from Luis Suárez.

== Non-competitive ==
=== Preseason ===
The full preseason schedule with matches in Central and South America was announced on January 10, 2025.

January 18 1	Inter Miami CF (United States)	2–2 (3–2 p)	(Mexico) América	Paradise, Nevada
10:00 pm EST	Messi 34'; Bright (yellow card) 73'; Avilés 90+2'	Report	Martín 31'; Juárez (yellow card) 47'; Reyes 52'	Stadium: Allegiant Stadium; Attendance: 45,262; Referee: Armando Villarreal (United States)
	Penalties
	Redondo (penalty missed); Martínez (penalty scored); Gressel (penalty missed); Ruiz (penalty scored); Weigandt (penalty missed); Morales (penalty scored)		(penalty missed) Dávila; (penalty missed) Cervantes; (penalty missed) R. Sánchez; (penalty scored) Dilrosun; (penalty scored) Calderón; (penalty missed) Juárez

January 29 2	Universitario (Peru)	0–0 (4–5 p)	(United States) Inter Miami CF	Lima, Peru
8:00 pm EST	Riveros (yellow card) 3'; Murrugarra (yellow card) 58'	Report	Weigandt (yellow card) 9'; Avilés (yellow card) 80'	Stadium: Estadio Monumental; Attendance: 80,000; Referee: Daniel Ureta (Peru)
	Penalties
	Churín (penalty scored); Calcaterra (penalty scored); Vélez (penalty missed); Concha (penalty scored); Rivera (penalty scored)		(penalty scored) Gressel; (penalty scored) Morales; (penalty scored) Ruiz; (penalty scored) Cremaschi; (penalty scored) Bright

February 2 3	Sporting San Miguelito (Panama)	1–3	(United States) Inter Miami CF	Panama City, Panama
5:00 pm EST	Henricks 24'; Cundumí (yellow card) 70' (yellow-red card) 71'; Girón (yellow card) 81'	Report	Allen (yellow card) 38'; Cremaschi 45+1'; Allende 48'; Picault 64'	Stadium: Estadio Rommel Fernández Gutiérrez; Referee: Fernando Morón (Panama)

February 8 4	Olimpia (Honduras)	0–5	(United States) Inter Miami CF	San Pedro Sula, Honduras
8:00 pm EST		Report	Messi 27'; Redondo 44'; Allen 45+2'; Suárez 54'; Sailor 79'	Stadium: Estadio Olímpico Metropolitano; Attendance: 35,459; Referee: Saíd Martínez (Honduras)

February 14 5	Orlando City SC (United States)	2–2	(United States) Inter Miami CF	Tampa, Florida
7:30 pm EST	Ojeda 15'; Schlegel (yellow card) 17'; Araújo (yellow card) 40'; Enrique 54'	Report	Allende 22'; Busquets (yellow card) 53'; Cremaschi (yellow card) 82'; Picault 90+3'	Stadium: Raymond James Stadium; Attendance: 42,017; Referee: Filip Dujic (Canada)

== Competitive ==
=== Overview ===
Competition	First match	Last match	Starting round	Final position	Record							
Competition	First match	Last match	Starting round	Final position	Pld	W	D	L	GF	GA	GD	Win %
Major League Soccer	February 22	October 18	Matchday 1	3rd	34	19	8	7	81	55	+26	55.88
MLS Cup playoffs	October 24	December 6	Round one	Winners	6	5	0	1	20	5	+15	83.33
CONCACAF Champions Cup	February 19	April 30	Round one	Semifinals	8	5	0	3	12	8	+4	62.50
FIFA Club World Cup	June 14	June 29	Group stage	Round of 16	4	1	2	1	4	7	−3	25.00
Leagues Cup	July 30	August 31	League phase	Runners-up	6	4	1	1	12	9	+3	66.67
Total					58	34	11	13	129	84	+45	58.62

Source: ESPN

=== Major League Soccer ===
==== League tables ====
MLS Eastern Conference table (2025)
Pos	Team	Pld	W	L	T	GF	GA	GD	Pts	Qualification
1	Philadelphia Union	34	20	8	6	57	35	+22	66	Qualification for round one and the CONCACAF Champions Cup round one
2	FC Cincinnati	34	20	9	5	52	40	+12	65	Qualification for round one
3	Inter Miami CF	34	19	7	8	81	55	+26	65	Qualification for round one
4	Charlotte FC	34	19	13	2	55	46	+9	59	Qualification for round one
5	New York City FC	34	17	12	5	50	44	+6	56	Qualification for round one

Source: MLS
Rules for classification: 1) points; 2) total wins; 3) total goal differential; 4) total goals scored; 5) fewer disciplinary points; 6) away goal differential; 7) away goals scored; 8) home goals differential; 9) home goals scored; 10) coin toss (2 clubs tied) or drawing of lots (≥3 clubs tied)

Overall MLS standings table (2025)
Pos	Team	Pld	W	L	T	GF	GA	GD	Pts	Qualification
1	Philadelphia Union (S)	34	20	8	6	57	35	+22	66	Qualification for the CONCACAF Champions Cup round one (Note: As 2025 MLS Supporters' Shield champions)
2	FC Cincinnati	34	20	9	5	52	40	+12	65	Qualification for the CONCACAF Champions Cup round one (Note: As highest-ranked club in 2025 MLS Supporters' Shield not already qualified)
3	Inter Miami CF (C)	34	19	7	8	81	55	+26	65	Qualification for the CONCACAF Champions Cup round of 16 (Note: As 2025 MLS Cup champions)
4	San Diego FC	34	19	9	6	64	41	+23	63	Qualification for the CONCACAF Champions Cup round one (Note: As Western Conference regular season winners)
5	Vancouver Whitecaps FC (V)	34	18	7	9	66	38	+28	63	Qualification for the CONCACAF Champions Cup round one (Note: As second highest-ranked club in 2025 MLS Supporters' Shield not already qualified)

Source: MLS
Rules for classification: 1) points; 2) total wins; 3) total goal differential; 4) total goals scored; 5) fewer disciplinary points; 6) away goal differential; 7) away goals scored; 8) home goals differential; 9) home goals scored; 10) coin toss (2 clubs tied) or drawing of lots (≥3 clubs tied)
(C) MLS Cup champions; (S) Supporters' Shield winners; (V) Canadian Championship winners

==== Results summary ====
Overall								Home						Away					
Pld	W	D	L	GF	GA	GD	Pts	W	D	L	GF	GA	GD	W	D	L	GF	GA	GD
34	19	8	7	81	55	+26	65	11	3	3	44	26	+18	8	5	4	37	29	+8

Source: MLS standings

==== Results by round ====
Round	1	2	3	4	5	6	7	8	9	10	11	12	13	14	15	16	17	18	19	20	21	22	23	24	25	26	27	28	29	30	31	32	33	34
Stadium	H	A	H	A	H	H	A	A	H	H	A	A	H	A	H	H	A	A	H	A	A	H	A	H	A	A	H	H	A	A	H	H	H	A
Result	D	W	W	W	W	D	D	W	L	W	L	D	L	D	W	W	W	W	W	L	W	D	L	W	D	L	W	W	W	D	L	W	W	W
Position (East)	8	3	2	1	1	2	4	3	5	4	4	5	6	7	6	3	6	5	5	5	5	5	6	5	6	8	5	5	3	4	4	3	3	3

Source: MLS standings
A = Away; H = Home; W = Win; D = Draw; L = Loss; P = Postponed

==== Match results ====
The MLS regular season schedule was released on December 19, 2024. Inter Miami CF played 34 matches—17 at home and 17 away—primarily against the 14 other teams in the Eastern Conference; the team also played six opponents from the Western Conference. The regular season included a break for the 2025 FIFA Club World Cup in June, but no break for the 2025 Leagues Cup in August.

February 22 1	Inter Miami CF	2–2	New York City FC	Fort Lauderdale, Florida
7:30 pm EST	Avilés 5', (red card) 23'; Alba (yellow card) 23'; Cremaschi (yellow card) 41'; Segovia 90+10'; Messi (yellow card) 90+11'	Report	Ilenič 26'; Tanasijević (yellow card) 45+1'; Martínez 55'; Freese (yellow card) 90+4'	Stadium: Chase Stadium; Attendance: 21,184; Referee: Alexis Da Silva

March 2 2	Houston Dynamo FC	1–4	Inter Miami CF	Houston, Texas
7:00 pm EST	Aliyu (yellow card) 27'; Awodesu (yellow card) 59'; Lodeiro (yellow card) 73', (goal) 85'	Report	Segovia 6', 45+2'; Bright (yellow card) 16'; Allende 37'; Suárez 79'; Afonso (yellow card) 90+2'; Cremaschi (yellow card) 90+4'; Alba (yellow card) 90+5'; Fray (red card) 90+6'	Stadium: Shell Energy Stadium; Attendance: 20,810; Referee: Joe Dickerson
Note: On March 6, 2025, the Independent Review Panel rescinded the red card given to Inter Miami player Ian Fray.

March 9 3	Inter Miami CF	1–0	Charlotte FC	Fort Lauderdale, Florida
4:00 pm EDT	Avilés (yellow card) 30'; Ustari (red card) 38'; Suárez (yellow card) 45'; Allende 46'; Bright (yellow card) 90+3'	Report	Malanda (yellow card) 82'	Stadium: Chase Stadium; Attendance: 20,436; Referee: Guido Gonzales Jr.
Note: The match was originally scheduled for a 5:00 pm kickoff, but was moved an hour later per a prior announcement.

March 16 4	Atlanta United FC	1–2	Inter Miami CF	Atlanta, Georgia
7:00 pm EDT	Latte Lath 11'; Pedro Amador (yellow card) 45'; Gregersen (yellow card) 62'; Mosquera (yellow card) 90+2'	Report	Messi 20'; Allen (yellow card) 42'; Picault 89'	Stadium: Mercedes-Benz Stadium; Attendance: 42,843; Referee: Drew Fischer

March 29 5	Inter Miami CF	2–1	Philadelphia Union	Fort Lauderdale, Florida
7:30 pm EDT	Cremaschi (yellow card) 21'; Taylor 23'; Messi 57'; Bright (yellow card) 76'; Falcón (yellow card) 79'; Busquets (yellow card) 90+2'; Alba (yellow card) 90+4'; Suárez (yellow card) 90+5'	Report	Baribo (yellow card) 45'; Gazdag 80'; Glesnes (yellow card) 88'	Stadium: Chase Stadium; Attendance: 20,617; Referee: Rosendo Mendoza

April 6 6	Inter Miami CF	1–1	Toronto FC	Fort Lauderdale, Florida
7:00 pm EDT	Segovia (yellow card) 45+1'; Messi 45+5'	Report	Thompson (yellow card) 18'; Bernardeschi 45+2'	Stadium: Chase Stadium; Attendance: 20,220; Referee: Rubiel Vazquez

April 13 7	Chicago Fire FC	0–0	Inter Miami CF	Chicago, Illinois
4:30 pm EDT	Pineda (yellow card) 3'; Gutiérrez (yellow card) 36'; Elliott (yellow card) 62'; Oregel (yellow card) 76'; Terán (yellow card) 84'	Report	Redondo (yellow card) 20'; Suárez (yellow card) 23'; Cremaschi (yellow card) 38'	Stadium: Soldier Field; Attendance: 62,358; Referee: Jon Freemon

April 19 8	Columbus Crew	0–1	Inter Miami CF	Cleveland, Ohio
4:30 pm EDT		Report	Cremaschi 30'; Falcón (yellow card) 82'; Luján (yellow card) 87'	Stadium: Huntington Bank Field; Attendance: 60,614; Referee: Tori Penso
Note: The Columbus Crew moved this home match to Cleveland due to the anticipated demand.

April 27 9	Inter Miami CF	3–4	FC Dallas	Fort Lauderdale, Florida
5:00 pm EDT	Picault 16'; Obando 29'; Martínez 56'	Report	Moore 8'; Urhoghide 65'; Julio 69'; Pedrinho 81'; Acosta (yellow card) 83'	Stadium: Chase Stadium; Attendance: 20,727; Referee: Lukasz Szpala

May 3 10	Inter Miami CF	4–1	New York Red Bulls	Fort Lauderdale, Florida
7:30 pm EDT	Picault 9'; Bright (yellow card) 14'; Weigandt 30'; Suárez 39'; Messi 67'	Report	Sofo 43'; Stroud (yellow card) 52'; S. Nealis (yellow card) 75'	Stadium: Chase Stadium; Attendance: 20,598; Referee: Ismir Pekmic

May 10 11	Minnesota United FC	4–1	Inter Miami CF	Saint Paul, Minnesota
4:30 pm EDT	Hlongwane 32'; Boxall (yellow card) 45'; Markanich 45+2'; Weigandt 68' (o.g.); Lod 70'	Report	Messi 48'; Luján (yellow card) 80'	Stadium: Allianz Field; Attendance: 19,710; Referee: Filip Dujic

May 14 12	San Jose Earthquakes	3–3	Inter Miami CF	San Jose, California
10:30 pm EDT	Arango 3'; Leroux 37'; Harkes 45+4'; Costa (yellow card) 45+7'; Bouda (yellow card) 66'; Romney (yellow card) 74'	Report	Falcón 1'; Allende 44', 52'; Allen (yellow card) 74'	Stadium: PayPal Park; Attendance: 18,000; Referee: Joe Dickerson

May 18 13	Inter Miami CF	0–3	Orlando City SC	Fort Lauderdale, Florida
7:00 pm EDT	Allen (yellow card) 11'; Falcón (yellow card) 55'; Suárez (yellow card) 73'; Messi (yellow card) 75'	Report	Muriel 43'; Pašalić 53'; Þórhallsson 90+4'	Stadium: Chase Stadium; Attendance: 20,859; Referee: Guido Gonzales Jr.

May 24 14	Philadelphia Union	3–3	Inter Miami CF	Chester, Pennsylvania
7:30 pm EDT	Sullivan 7'; Vassilev (yellow card) 41'; Baribo 44', 73'; Bueno (yellow card) 75'; Glesnes (yellow card) 86'; Jean Jacques (yellow card) 90+7'	Report	Fray (yellow card) 42'; Allende 60'; Alba (yellow card) 76'; Messi 87'; Redondo (yellow card) 90+2'; Segovia 90+5'	Stadium: Subaru Park; Attendance: 19,357; Referee: Drew Fischer

May 28 15	Inter Miami CF	4–2	CF Montréal	Fort Lauderdale, Florida
7:30 pm EDT	Messi 27', 87'; Busquets (yellow card) 42'; Segovia (yellow card) 54'; Martínez (yellow card) 61'; Suárez 68', 71'	Report	Campbell (yellow card) 58'; Sealy 74'; Loturi 90+2'	Stadium: Chase Stadium; Attendance: 20,005; Referee: Jon Freemon

May 31 16	Inter Miami CF	5–1	Columbus Crew	Fort Lauderdale, Florida
7:30 pm EDT	Allende 13'; Messi 15', 24'; Martínez (yellow card) 57'; Suárez 64'; Picault 89'	Report	Ruvalcaba 58', (yellow card) 62'	Stadium: Chase Stadium; Attendance: 20,861; Referee: Rosendo Mendoza

July 5 17	CF Montréal	1–4	Inter Miami CF	Montreal, Quebec
7:30 pm EDT	Owusu 2'; Álvarez (yellow card) 45+2'	Report	Allende 33'; Messi 40', 62'; Busquets (yellow card) 54'; Segovia 60'; Martínez (yellow card) 88'	Stadium: Stade Saputo; Attendance: 19,619; Referee: Marcos de Oliveira

July 9 18	New England Revolution	1–2	Inter Miami CF	Foxborough, Massachusetts
7:30 pm EDT	Gil 80'; Campana (yellow card) 51'	Report	Messi 27', 38'; Gallego (yellow card) 34'; Redondo (yellow card) 55'; Falcón (yellow card) 75'	Stadium: Gillette Stadium; Attendance: 43,293; Referee: Fotis Bakazos

July 12 19	Inter Miami CF	2–1	Nashville SC	Fort Lauderdale, Florida
7:30 pm EDT	Messi 17', 62'; Segovia (yellow card) 52'; Weigandt (yellow card) 87'	Report	Yazbek (yellow card) 24'; Mukhtar 49'; Maher (yellow card) 90+3'	Stadium: Chase Stadium; Attendance: 21,108; Referee: Filip Dujic

July 16 20	FC Cincinnati	3–0	Inter Miami CF	Cincinnati, Ohio
7:30 pm EDT	Valenzuela 16'; Evander 50', 70'; Hadebe (yellow card) 81'	Report		Stadium: TQL Stadium; Attendance: 25,513; Referee: Lukasz Szpala

July 19 21	New York Red Bulls	1–5	Inter Miami CF	Harrison, New Jersey
7:30 pm EDT	Hack 14'; Donkor (yellow card) 34'; Edwards (yellow card) 54'	Report	Segovia (yellow card) 11', (goal) 27', 45+3'; Alba 24'; Falcón (yellow card) 29'; Weigandt (yellow card) 45+6'; Messi 60', 75'	Stadium: Sports Illustrated Stadium; Attendance: 25,219; Referee: Victor Rivas

July 26 22	Inter Miami CF	0−0	FC Cincinnati	Fort Lauderdale, Florida
7:30 pm EDT	Cremaschi (yellow card) 7'; Avilés (yellow card) 36'; Redondo (yellow card) 60'; Weigandt (yellow card) 90'	Report		Stadium: Chase Stadium; Attendance: 21,044; Referee: Tori Penso

August 10 23	Orlando City SC	4–1	Inter Miami CF	Orlando, Florida
7:30 pm EDT	Muriel 2', 50'; Freeman (yellow card) 26'; Araújo (yellow card) 38'; Jansson (yellow card) 40'; Ojeda 58'; Pašalić 88'	Report	Bright 5'; Falcón (yellow card) 34'; Allen (yellow card) 45'	Stadium: Inter&Co Stadium; Attendance: 25,046; Referee: Armando Villarreal

August 16 24	Inter Miami CF	3–1	LA Galaxy	Fort Lauderdale, Florida
7:30 pm EDT	Alba 43'; Messi 84'; Suárez 90'	Report	Paintsil 59'	Stadium: Chase Stadium; Attendance: 20,846; Referee: Drew Fischer

August 23 25	D.C. United	1–1	Inter Miami CF	Washington, D.C.
7:30 pm EDT	Hopkins 13'; Herrera (yellow card) 36'; Peltola (yellow card) 41'	Report	Cremaschi (yellow card) 51'; Rodríguez 64'; Suárez (yellow card) 90+7'	Stadium: Audi Field; Attendance: 19,365; Referee: Ricardo Montero

September 13 26	Charlotte FC	3–0	Inter Miami CF	Charlotte, North Carolina
7:30 pm EDT	Toklomati 34', 47', 84' (pen.); Bronico (yellow card) 43'; Marshall-Rutty (yellow card) 55'	Report	Fray (yellow card) 22'; Messi (penalty missed) 32'; Segovia (yellow card) 56'; Avilés (yellow card) 67' (yellow-red card) 79'; Weigandt (yellow card) 78'	Stadium: Bank of America Stadium; Attendance: 35,607; Referee: Serhiy Boyko

September 16 27	Inter Miami CF	3–1	Seattle Sounders FC	Fort Lauderdale, Florida
7:30 pm EDT	Alba 12', (yellow card) 78'; Messi 41'; Fray 52'; Silvetti (yellow card) 83'	Report	Vargas 69'	Stadium: Chase Stadium; Attendance: 19,934; Referee: Guido Gonzales Jr.

September 20 28	Inter Miami CF	3–2	D.C. United	Fort Lauderdale, Florida
7:30 pm EDT	Busquets (yellow card) 25'; Allende 35'; Luján (yellow card) 49'; Fray (yellow card) 62'; Messi 66', 85'; Segovia (yellow card) 72'; Silvetti (penalty missed) 72'; Falcón (yellow card) 76'; Gallego (yellow card) 77'	Report	Benteke 53'; Peglow (yellow card) 82'; Rowles (yellow card) 90'; Murrell 90+7'	Stadium: Chase Stadium; Attendance: 20,319; Referee: Ismir Pekmic

September 24 29	New York City FC	0–4	Inter Miami CF	New York City, New York
7:30 pm EDT	Perea (yellow card) 32'; Haak (yellow card) 83'	Report	Silvetti (yellow card) 18'; Alba (yellow card) 41'; Rodríguez 43'; Messi 74', 86'; Suárez 83' (pen.)	Stadium: Citi Field; Attendance: 40,845; Referee: Filip Dujic

September 27 30	Toronto FC	1–1	Inter Miami CF	Toronto, Ontario
4:30 pm EDT	Mihailovic 60', (yellow card) 80'; Petretta (yellow card) 82'	Report	Suárez (yellow card) 45'; Allende 45+1'	Stadium: BMO Field; Attendance: 28,855; Referee: Pierre-Luc Lauzière

September 30 31	Inter Miami CF	3–5	Chicago Fire FC	Fort Lauderdale, Florida
7:30 pm EDT	Avilés 39', (yellow card) 45+3'; Suárez 57', 74'; Busquets (yellow card) 68'; Rodríguez (yellow card) 68'; Bright (yellow card) 78'	Report	D'Avilla 11'; Dean 31'; Bamba (yellow card) 32'; Kouamé 43'; Franco (yellow card) 69'; Reynolds 80'; Gutiérrez 83'; Elliott (yellow card) 86'	Stadium: Chase Stadium; Attendance: 19,766; Referee: Allen Chapman
Note: The match was originally scheduled for August 30, but was postponed due to Inter Miami's participation in the 2025 Leagues Cup final.

October 4 32	Inter Miami CF	4–1	New England Revolution	Fort Lauderdale, Florida
7:30 pm EDT	Allende 32', 60'; Alba 45+3', 63'; De Paul (yellow card) 86'; Falcón (yellow card) 88'	Report	Ceballos (yellow card) 29'; Turgeman 59'	Stadium: Chase Stadium; Attendance: 21,550; Referee: Ismail Elfath

October 11 33	Inter Miami CF	4–0	Atlanta United FC	Fort Lauderdale, Florida
7:30 pm EDT	Messi 39', 87'; Alba 52'; Suárez 61'	Report		Stadium: Chase Stadium; Attendance: 16,888; Referee: Tim Ford
Note: The match was originally scheduled for June 28, but was postponed due to Inter Miami's participation in the 2025 FIFA Club World Cup knockout stage.

October 18 34	Nashville SC	2–5	Inter Miami CF	Nashville, Tennessee
6:00 pm EDT	Surridge 43'; Shaffelburg 45+6'; Mukhtar (yellow card) 64'	Report	Allende (yellow card) 22'; Messi 34', 63' (pen.), 81'; Rodríguez 67'; De Paul (yellow card) 68'; Segovia 90+1'	Stadium: Geodis Park; Attendance: 30,109; Referee: Jon Freemon

=== MLS Cup playoffs ===
October 24 Round one match 1	Inter Miami CF	3–1	Nashville SC	Fort Lauderdale, Florida
8:00 pm EDT	Messi 19', 90+6'; Busquets (yellow card) 54'; De Paul (yellow card) 56'; Allende 62'	Report	Surridge (yellow card) 56'; Mukhtar 90+11'	Stadium: Chase Stadium; Attendance: 21,398; Referee: Filip Dujic

November 1 Round one match 2	Nashville SC	2–1	Inter Miami CF	Nashville, Tennessee
7:30 pm EDT	Tagseth (yellow card) 4'; Surridge 9' (pen.), (yellow card) 78'; Yazbek (yellow card) 15'; Bauer 45'; Shaffelburg (yellow card) 84'; Acosta (yellow card) 90+6'	Report	Messi 90'	Stadium: Geodis Park; Attendance: 30,109; Referee: Allen Chapman

November 8 Round one match 3	Inter Miami CF	4–0	Nashville SC	Fort Lauderdale, Florida
8:00 pm EST	Messi 10', 39', (yellow card) 77'; Rodríguez (yellow card) 34'; De Paul (yellow card) 43'; Silvetti (yellow card) 69'; Allende 73', 76'	Report	Zimmerman (yellow card) 45+1'; Maher (yellow card) 67'; Bunbury (yellow card) 79'; Lovitz (yellow card) 80'	Stadium: Chase Stadium; Attendance: 19,049; Referee: Rosendo Mendoza
Note: Inter Miami CF won the series 2–1.

November 23 Conference semifinals	FC Cincinnati	0–4	Inter Miami CF	Cincinnati, Ohio
5:00 pm EST		Report	Messi 19'; Silvetti 57'; Allende 62', 74'	Stadium: TQL Stadium; Attendance: 25,513; Referee: Drew Fischer

November 29 Conference finals	Inter Miami CF	5–1	New York City FC	Fort Lauderdale, Florida
6:00 pm EST	Allende 14', 23', 89'; Weigandt (yellow card) 22'; Allen (yellow card) 33'; Silvetti 67'; Rodríguez (yellow card) 70'; Segovia 83'; Bright (yellow card) 87'	Report	Moralez (yellow card) 20'; Fernandez (yellow card) 31'; Haak 37', (yellow card) 73'; O'Toole (yellow card) 65'	Stadium: Chase Stadium; Attendance: 19,136; Referee: Jon Freemon

December 6 MLS Cup	Inter Miami CF	3–1	Vancouver Whitecaps FC	Fort Lauderdale, Florida
2:30 pm EST	Ocampo 8' (o.g.); Rodríguez (yellow card) 13'; Falcón (yellow card) 48'; De Paul 71', (yellow card) 86'; Allende 90+6'; Ríos Novo (yellow card) 90+8'	Report	White (yellow card) 17'; Ocampo (yellow card) 45'; Ahmed 60'; Blackmon (yellow card) 66'; Cubas (yellow card) 74'; Laborda (yellow card) 86'; Berhalter (yellow card) 90+4'	Stadium: Chase Stadium; Attendance: 21,556; Referee: Drew Fischer

=== CONCACAF Champions Cup ===
Inter Miami CF qualified for the tournament as the 2024 MLS Supporters' Shield winners. They were placed into Pot 1 as one of the top eight clubs in the CONCACAF Club Rankings for the round one draw.

==== Round one ====
February 19 First leg	Sporting Kansas City (United States)	0–1	(United States) Inter Miami CF	Kansas City, Kansas
8:00 pm EST	García (yellow card) 74'	Report	Messi 56'; Redondo (yellow card) 80'	Stadium: Children's Mercy Park; Attendance: 15,178; Referee: Marco Ortíz (Mexico)
Note: Due to expected snowfall in the Kansas City metropolitan area, the match was moved a day later than originally scheduled.

February 25 Second leg	Inter Miami CF (United States)	3–1 (4–1 agg.)	(United States) Sporting Kansas City	Fort Lauderdale, Florida
8:00 pm EST	Messi 19'; Allende 45+1'; Suárez 45+3'	Report	Rodríguez 63'	Stadium: Chase Stadium; Attendance: 18,280; Referee: Ismael Cornejo (El Salvador)

==== Round of 16 ====
March 6 First leg	Inter Miami CF (United States)	2–0	(Jamaica) Cavalier	Fort Lauderdale, Florida
8:00 pm EST	Busquets (yellow card) 24'; Allende 61'; Suárez (yellow card) 66', (goal) 83'; Redondo (yellow card) 89'; Fray (yellow card) 90+1'	Report	Calvin (yellow card) 5'	Stadium: Chase Stadium; Attendance: 15,413; Referee: Mario Escobar (Guatemala)

March 13 Second leg	Cavalier (Jamaica)	0–2 (0–4 agg.)	(United States) Inter Miami CF	Kingston, Jamaica
7:00 pm EDT	King (yellow card) 79'	Report	Suárez 37' (pen.); Messi 90+2'	Stadium: National Stadium; Attendance: 35,000; Referee: Keylor Herrera (Costa Rica)

==== Quarterfinals ====
April 2 First leg	Los Angeles FC (United States)	1–0	(United States) Inter Miami CF	Los Angeles, California
11:30 pm EDT	Ordaz (yellow card) 26', (goal) 57'	Report	Segovia (yellow card) 66'; Busquets (yellow card) 71'	Stadium: BMO Stadium; Attendance: 22,207; Referee: Oshane Nation (Jamaica)

April 9 Second leg	Inter Miami CF (United States)	3–1 (3–2 agg.)	(United States) Los Angeles FC	Fort Lauderdale, Florida
8:00 pm EDT	Messi 35', 84' (pen.); Bright (yellow card) 53'; Redondo 61'; Falcón (yellow card) 71'	Report	Long 9'; Hollingshead (yellow card) 30'; Marlon (yellow card) 89'; Segura (yellow card) 90+3'	Stadium: Chase Stadium; Attendance: 19,609; Referee: César Ramos (Mexico)

==== Semifinals ====
April 24 First leg	Vancouver Whitecaps FC (Canada)	2–0	(United States) Inter Miami CF	Vancouver, British Columbia
10:30 pm EDT	White 24', (yellow card) 45+2'; Blackmon (yellow card) 48'; Berhalter 85', (yellow card) 90+4'	Report	Redondo (yellow card) 48'; Bright (yellow card) 73'	Stadium: BC Place; Attendance: 53,837; Referee: Mario Escobar (Guatemala)

April 30 Second leg	Inter Miami CF (United States)	1–3 (1–5 agg.)	(Canada) Vancouver Whitecaps FC	Fort Lauderdale, Florida
8:00 pm EDT	Alba 9'; Falcón (yellow card) 24'; Redondo (yellow card) 45+1'; Segovia (yellow card) 62'	Report	Johnson (yellow card) 33'; Berhalter (yellow card) 45+1', (goal) 71'; White 51'; Vite 53'; Cubas (yellow card) 65'	Stadium: Chase Stadium; Attendance: 21,225; Referee: Saíd Martínez (Honduras)

=== FIFA Club World Cup ===
Inter Miami CF qualified for the tournament as the host country representative team by winning the 2024 MLS Supporters' Shield. They opened the tournament at Hard Rock Stadium in Miami Gardens on June 14, 2025.

==== Group stage ====
The draw for the group stage was held on December 5, 2024. Inter Miami CF was in Pot 4 but automatically assigned to Group A for scheduling purposes.

Pos	Team	Pld	W	D	L	GF	GA	GD	Pts	Qualification
1	(Brazil) Palmeiras	3	1	2	0	4	2	+2	5 (Note: Tied on head-to-head result (Inter Miami CF 2–2 Palmeiras). Overall goal difference was used as the tiebreaker.)	Advance to knockout stage
2	(United States) Inter Miami CF	3	1	2	0	4	3	+1	5	Advance to knockout stage
3	(Portugal) Porto	3	0	2	1	5	6	−1	2 (Note: Tied on head-to-head result (Porto 4–4 Al Ahly). Overall goal difference was used as the tiebreaker.)	
4	(Egypt) Al Ahly	3	0	2	1	4	6	−2	2	

Source: FIFA
Rules for classification: Group stage tiebreakers
Notes:

June 14 1	Al Ahly (Egypt)	0–0	(United States) Inter Miami CF	Miami Gardens, Florida
8:00 pm EDT	Trézéguet (penalty missed) 43'; Attia (yellow card) 90+2'	Report	Avilés (yellow card) 25'; Redondo (yellow card) 31'; Busquets (yellow card) 86'; Suárez (yellow card) 90+3'	Stadium: Hard Rock Stadium; Attendance: 60,927; Referee: Alireza Faghani (Australia)

June 19 2	Inter Miami CF (United States)	2–1	(Portugal) Porto	Atlanta, Georgia
3:00 pm EDT	Segovia 47'; Messi 54'	Report	Aghehowa 8' (pen.)	Stadium: Mercedes-Benz Stadium; Attendance: 31,783; Referee: Cristián Garay (Chile)

June 23 3	Inter Miami CF (United States)	2–2	(Brazil) Palmeiras	Miami Gardens, Florida
9:00 pm EDT	Allende 16'; Messi (yellow card) 45+1'; Suárez 65'	Report	Paulinho 80'; Maurício 87'	Stadium: Hard Rock Stadium; Attendance: 60,914; Referee: Szymon Marciniak (Poland)

==== Knockout stage ====
June 29 Round of 16	Paris Saint-Germain (France)	4–0	(United States) Inter Miami CF	Atlanta, Georgia
12:00 pm EDT	Neves 6', 39'; Avilés 44' (o.g.); Hakimi 45+3'	Report	Avilés (yellow card) 20'; Weigandt (yellow card) 42'; Suárez (yellow card) 74'	Stadium: Mercedes-Benz Stadium; Attendance: 65,574; Referee: Wilton Sampaio (Brazil)

=== Leagues Cup ===
Inter Miami CF qualified for the 2025 Leagues Cup as one of the top nine teams in the Eastern Conference standings during the 2024 season. They did not play in the 2025 U.S. Open Cup and instead were represented by Inter Miami CF II, their reserve team from MLS Next Pro.

==== League phase ====
Pos	Team	Pld	W	PW	PL	L	GF	GA	GD	Pts	Qualification
1	Seattle Sounders FC	3	3	0	0	0	11	2	+9	9	Advance to knockout stage
2	Inter Miami CF	3	2	1	0	0	7	4	+3	8	Advance to knockout stage
3	LA Galaxy	3	2	0	1	0	10	3	+7	7	Advance to knockout stage
4	Orlando City SC	3	2	0	1	0	9	3	+6	7	Advance to knockout stage
5	Portland Timbers	3	2	0	1	0	6	1	+5	7	

Source: Leagues Cup

July 30 1	Inter Miami CF (United States)	2–1	(Mexico) Atlas	Fort Lauderdale, Florida
7:30 pm EDT	Segovia 58'; Redondo (yellow card) 85'; Weigandt 90+6'	Report	Dória (yellow card) 13'; Rodríguez (yellow card) 26'; Lozano 80'; Rocha (yellow card) 88'	Stadium: Chase Stadium; Attendance: 19,876; Referee: Juan Gabriel Calderón (Costa Rica)

August 2 2	Inter Miami CF (United States)	2–2 (5–4 p)	(Mexico) Necaxa	Fort Lauderdale, Florida
7:00 pm EDT	Segovia 12'; Falcón (red card) 17'; Suárez (yellow card) 45+2'; Alba 90+2'	Report	Badaloni 33'; Calderón (yellow card) 45+2' (yellow-red card) 60'; Monreal 81'	Stadium: Chase Stadium; Attendance: 20,043; Referee: Daniel Quintero (Mexico)
	Penalties
	De Paul (penalty scored); Cremaschi (penalty scored); Alba (penalty scored); Redondo (penalty scored); Suárez (penalty scored)		(penalty scored) Palavecino; (penalty scored) Rojas; (penalty missed) Badaloni; (penalty scored) Monreal; (penalty scored) Unsain

August 6 3	Inter Miami CF (United States)	3–1	(Mexico) Pumas UNAM	Fort Lauderdale, Florida
7:30 pm EDT	De Paul 45'; Suárez (yellow card) 50', (goal) 59' (pen.); Allende 69'	Report	Angulo (yellow card) 18'; Ruvalcaba 34'; Silva (yellow card) 51'	Stadium: Chase Stadium; Attendance: 18,824; Referee: Ismael Cornejo (El Salvador)

==== Knockout stage ====
August 20 Quarterfinals	Inter Miami CF (United States)	2–1	(Mexico) Tigres UANL	Fort Lauderdale, Florida
8:00 pm EDT	Segovia (yellow card) 4'; Suárez 23' (pen.), 89' (pen.); De Paul (yellow card) 88'	Report	Correa 67'; Brunetta (yellow card) 87'	Stadium: Chase Stadium; Attendance: 18,597; Referee: Mario Escobar (Guatemala)

August 27 Semifinals	Inter Miami CF (United States)	3–1	(United States) Orlando City SC	Fort Lauderdale, Florida
8:30 pm EDT	Fray (yellow card) 65'; Messi 77' (pen.), 88', (yellow card) 90+4'; Suárez (yellow card) 80'; Segovia 90+1'; Busquets (yellow card) 90+3'	Report	Brekalo (yellow card) 18' (yellow-red card) 75'; Atuesta (yellow card) 19'; Pašalić 45+1'; Araújo (yellow card) 69'	Stadium: Chase Stadium; Attendance: 17,878; Referee: Walter López (Guatemala)

August 31 Final	Seattle Sounders FC (United States)	3–0	(United States) Inter Miami CF	Seattle, Washington
8:00 pm EDT	De Rosario 26'; A. Roldán 84' (pen.); Rothrock 89'	Report	Busquets (yellow card) 69'; Bright (yellow card) 82'	Stadium: Lumen Field; Attendance: 69,314; Referee: Juan Gabriel Calderón (Costa Rica)

== Management ==
Position	Staff
Ownership
President and Co-Owner	(England) David Beckham
Managing Owner	(United States) Jorge Mas
Co-Owner	(United States) Jose Mas
Front office
President of Business Operations	(Spain) Xavier Asensi
Vice President	(United States) Pablo Alvarez
President of Football Operations	(Spain) Raul Sanllehi
Sporting Director	(Argentina) Guillermo Hoyos
Coaching staff
Head coach	(Argentina) Javier Mascherano
Assistant coach	(Argentina) Lucas Rodriguez Pagano
Assistant coach	(Argentina) Leandro Stillitano
Assistant coach	(Argentina) Javier Morales
Goalkeeper coach	(Argentina) Mauro Dobler

Last updated: July 8, 2025
Source: Inter Miami CF

== Players ==
For the 2025 season, Inter Miami CF were permitted a maximum of 30 signed players on the first team, of which 10 roster positions were designated for supplemental and reserve players. Additional homegrown players were eligible to be signed to off-roster slots and were able to appear in MLS matches through short-term agreements. The senior players in the first 20 roster positions counted towards a base salary cap of $5.95 million with exceptions for certain categories, including up to three Designated Players who counted for a set amount in the cap. The total salary cap of $11.11 million included the use of general allocation money and other targeted spending mechanisms. MLS clubs were allowed to sign three senior Designated Players and three under-22 Designated Players to salaries that exceeded the salary cap with a maximum budget charge of $743,750. As of March 3, 2025, Inter Miami CF had $3.15 million in available general allocation money for the 2025 season.

=== Roster ===
As of October 30, 2025

Note: Flags indicate national team as defined under FIFA eligibility rules. Players may hold more than one non-FIFA nationality. Squad includes all players who had first team contracts or appearances during the 2024 season across all competitions. Ages listed for each player is calculated from February 22, 2025, the first matchday of the MLS regular season.

No.	Player	Nationality	Position	Date of birth (age)	Signed from	Contract ends	Notes
Goalkeepers
19	Oscar Ustari	Argentina	GK	July 3, 1986 (aged 38)	Free agent	2026	International
25	William Yarbrough	United States	GK	March 20, 1989 (aged 36)	(United States) San Jose Earthquakes	2025	
34	Rocco Ríos Novo	Argentina	GK	June 4, 2002 (aged 22)	(Argentina) Lanús	2025	On loan
Defenders
2	Gonzalo Luján	Argentina	DF	April 21, 2001 (aged 23)	(Argentina) San Lorenzo	2027	International
6	Tomás Avilés	Argentina	DF	August 3, 2004 (aged 20)	(Argentina) Racing Club	2026	
15	Ryan Sailor	United States	DF	November 27, 1998 (aged 26)	(United States) University of Washington	2025	
17	Ian Fray	Jamaica	DF	August 31, 2002 (aged 22)	(United States) Fort Lauderdale CF	2025	HGP
18	Jordi Alba	Spain	DF	March 21, 1989 (aged 35)	(Spain) Barcelona	2025	DP; International
26	Tyler Hall	United States	DF	February 5, 2006 (aged 19)	(United States) Inter Miami CF II	2027	HGP
32	Noah Allen	Greece	DF	April 28, 2004 (aged 20)	(United States) Inter Miami CF II	2028	HGP
37	Maximiliano Falcón	Uruguay	DF	May 1, 1997 (aged 27)	(Chile) Colo-Colo	2028	International
57	Marcelo Weigandt	Argentina	DF	January 11, 2000 (aged 25)	(Argentina) Boca Juniors	2025	On loan; International
62	Israel Boatwright	Dominican Republic	DF	June 2, 2005 (aged 19)	(United States) Inter Miami CF II	2026	HGP
Midfielders
5	Sergio Busquets	Spain	MF	July 16, 1988 (aged 36)	(Spain) Barcelona	2025	DP; International
7	Rodrigo De Paul	Argentina	MF	May 24, 1994 (aged 30)	(Spain) Atlético Madrid	2025	On loan; International
8	Telasco Segovia	Venezuela	MF	April 2, 2003 (aged 21)	(Portugal) Casa Pia	2029	International
11	Baltasar Rodríguez	Argentina	MF	July 9, 2003 (aged 21)	(Argentina) Racing Club	2025	On loan; International
41	David Ruiz	Honduras	MF	February 8, 2004 (aged 21)	(United States) Inter Miami CF II	2028	HGP
42	Yannick Bright	Italy	MF	September 3, 2001 (aged 23)	(United States) University of New Hampshire	2028	International
81	Santiago Morales	United States	MF	February 9, 2007 (aged 18)	(United States) Inter Miami CF II	2027	HGP
Forwards
9	Luis Suárez	Uruguay	FW	January 24, 1987 (aged 38)	(Brazil) Grêmio	2025	International
10	Lionel Messi (captain)	Argentina	FW	June 24, 1987 (aged 37)	(France) Paris Saint-Germain	2028	DP; International
14	Fafà Picault	Haiti	FW	February 23, 1991 (aged 33)	(Canada) Vancouver Whitecaps FC	2025	
21	Tadeo Allende	Argentina	FW	February 20, 1999 (aged 26)	(Spain) Celta Vigo	2025	On loan; International
24	Mateo Silvetti	Argentina	FW	January 14, 2006 (aged 19)	(Argentina) Newell's Old Boys	2029	International
29	Allen Obando	Ecuador	FW	June 13, 2006 (aged 18)	(Ecuador) Barcelona SC	2025	On loan; International

== Transfers ==
For transfers in, dates listed are when Inter Miami CF officially signed the player to the roster. Transactions where only the rights to the players are acquired are not listed. For transfers out, dates listed are when Inter Miami CF officially removed the players from its roster, not when they signed with another club. If a player later signed with another club, his new club will be noted, but the date listed here remains the one when he was officially removed from the Inter Miami CF roster.

=== In ===
Incoming transfers for Inter Miami CF
Player	No.	Pos.	Previous team	Notes	Date
Fafà Picault (HAI)	14	FW	Vancouver Whitecaps FC (CAN)	Free agent	December 31, 2024
Tadeo Allende (ARG)	21	FW	Celta Vigo (ESP)	Loan	January 14, 2025
Gonzalo Luján (ARG)	2	DF	San Lorenzo (ARG)	Transferred for undisclosed fee	January 16, 2025
Rocco Ríos Novo (ARG)	34	GK	Lanús (ARG)	Loan with purchase option	January 16, 2025
Telasco Segovia (VEN)	8	MF	Casa Pia (POR)	Transferred for undisclosed fee	January 17, 2025
Maximiliano Falcón (URU)	37	DF	Colo-Colo (CHI)	Transferred for undisclosed fee	February 1, 2025
Baltasar Rodríguez (ARG)	11	MF	Racing Club (ARG)	Loan with purchase option	March 10, 2025
Allen Obando (ECU)	29	FW	Barcelona SC (ECU)	Loan with purchase option	March 25, 2025
William Yarbrough (USA)	25	GK	San Jose Earthquakes (USA)	Free agent	May 21, 2025
Rodrigo De Paul (ARG)	7	MF	Atlético Madrid (ESP)	Loan with purchase option	July 25, 2025
Mateo Silvetti (ARG)	24	FW	Newell's Old Boys (ARG)	Transferred for undisclosed fee	August 22, 2025

=== Out ===
Outgoing transfers for Inter Miami CF
Player	No.	Pos.	New team	Notes	Date
Nicolás Freire (ARG)	21	DF	Pumas UNAM (MEX)	End of loan	December 9, 2024
Matías Rojas (PAR)	7	MF	River Plate (ARG)	Option declined	December 9, 2024
Serhiy Kryvtsov (UKR)	27	DF	Unattached	Option declined	December 9, 2024
Franco Negri (ARG)	33	DF	San Diego FC (USA)	Option declined	December 9, 2024
Felipe Valencia (USA)	35	MF	Unattached	Option declined	December 9, 2024
Lawson Sunderland (USA)	43	MF	Dordrecht (NED)	Option declined	December 9, 2024
Cole Jensen (USA)	99	GK	Union Omaha (USA)	Option declined	December 9, 2024
Diego Gómez (PAR)	20	MF	Brighton & Hove Albion (ENG)	Transferred for undisclosed fee	December 10, 2024
CJ dos Santos (USA)	13	GK	San Diego FC (USA)	Traded for $100,000 GAM	December 12, 2024
Leonardo Campana (ECU)	8	FW	New England Revolution (USA)	Traded for $2.5 million GAM	December 19, 2024
Emerson Rodríguez (COL)	25	MF	Ludogorets Razgrad (BUL)	Transferred for undisclosed fee	January 26, 2025
Facundo Farías (ARG)	11	MF	Estudiantes (ARG)	Transferred for undisclosed fee	February 1, 2025
Robert Taylor (FIN)	16	MF	Austin FC (USA)	Traded for $750,000 GAM	April 24, 2025
Julian Gressel (USA)	24	MF	Minnesota United FC (USA)	Waivers	April 29, 2025
David Martínez (PAR)	14	DF	River Plate (ARG)	End of loan	July 17, 2025
Leo Afonso (BRA)	22	FW	Atlanta United FC (USA)	Traded for international roster slot	July 27, 2025
Federico Redondo (ARG)	55	MF	Elche (ESP)	Transferred for undisclosed fee	August 14, 2025
Drake Callender (USA)	1	GK	Charlotte FC (USA)	Traded for $750,000 GAM	August 19, 2025
Benjamin Cremaschi (USA)	30	MF	Parma (ITA)	Loan with purchase option	September 2, 2025

=== Draft picks ===
Draft picks were not automatically signed to the team roster. Only those who were signed to a contract are listed as transfers in.

On December 20, 2024, Inter Miami CF traded its first-round pick in the 2025 MLS SuperDraft to Los Angeles FC in exchange for a 2026 second-round pick and $50,000 in general allocation money.

2025 MLS SuperDraft picks for Inter Miami CF
Player	Nationality	Round	Pick	Pos.	Previous team	Notes
Bailey Sparks	United States	2nd	52	MF	Southern Methodist University (USA)	
Michael Appiah	Ghana	3rd	82	FW	Florida International University (USA)	

== Statistics ==
Key
MLS = Major League Soccer, PO = MLS Cup playoffs, CCC = CONCACAF Champions Cup, CWC = FIFA Club World Cup, LC = Leagues Cup
A = Appearances, S = Starts, G = Goals

As of end of 2025 season

=== Appearances and goals ===
No.	Pos	Player	Nat	MLS			PO			CCC			CWC			LC			Total		
No.	Pos	Player	Nat	A	S	G	A	S	G	A	S	G	A	S	G	A	S	G	A	S	G
Goalkeepers
19	GK	Oscar Ustari	(Argentina)	25	25	0	0	0	0	8	8	0	4	4	0	3	3	0	40	40	0
34	GK	Rocco Ríos Novo	(Argentina)	10	7	0	6	6	0	0	0	0	0	0	0	3	3	0	19	16	0
~~1~~	GK	Drake Callender (Note: Player transferred out during the season)	(United States)	3	2	0	–	–	–	0	0	0	0	0	0	0	0	0	3	2	0
Defenders
2	DF	Gonzalo Luján	(Argentina)	26	21	0	2	0	0	6	2	0	0	0	0	6	5	0	40	28	0
6	DF	Tomás Avilés	(Argentina)	25	15	2	2	0	0	4	2	0	4	2	0	3	0	0	38	19	2
15	DF	Ryan Sailor	(United States)	5	1	0	0	0	0	0	0	0	0	0	0	0	0	0	5	1	0
17	DF	Ian Fray	(Jamaica)	21	13	1	5	4	0	3	3	0	2	2	0	4	3	0	35	25	1
18	DF	Jordi Alba	(Spain)	30	29	6	6	6	0	7	7	1	3	1	0	6	6	1	52	49	8
32	DF	Noah Allen	(Greece)	26	20	0	6	6	0	8	6	0	4	4	0	3	1	0	47	37	0
37	DF	Maximiliano Falcón	(Uruguay)	24	21	1	6	6	0	7	7	0	4	4	0	6	6	0	47	44	1
57	DF	Marcelo Weigandt	(Argentina)	24	18	1	3	2	0	4	4	0	4	3	0	4	3	1	39	30	2
~~14~~	DF	David Martínez	(Paraguay)	8	3	1	–	–	–	2	1	0	0	0	0	–	–	–	10	4	1
Midfielders
5	MF	Sergio Busquets	(Spain)	33	32	0	6	6	0	7	7	0	4	4	0	6	6	0	56	55	0
7	MF	Rodrigo De Paul	(Argentina)	11	9	0	6	6	1	–	–	–	–	–	–	6	6	1	23	21	2
8	MF	Telasco Segovia	(Venezuela)	31	19	8	6	0	1	8	8	0	4	4	1	6	4	3	55	35	13
11	MF	Baltasar Rodríguez	(Argentina)	14	6	3	6	6	0	0	0	0	1	0	0	1	1	0	22	13	3
41	MF	David Ruiz	(Honduras)	4	2	0	0	0	0	3	1	0	0	0	0	0	0	0	7	3	0
42	MF	Yannick Bright	(Italy)	27	16	1	5	0	0	6	2	0	0	0	0	5	4	0	43	22	1
81	MF	Santiago Morales	(United States)	4	0	0	0	0	0	1	0	0	0	0	0	0	0	0	5	0	0
~~16~~	MF	Robert Taylor	(Finland)	4	2	1	–	–	–	3	0	0	–	–	–	–	–	–	7	2	1
~~30~~	MF	Benjamin Cremaschi	(United States)	22	16	1	–	–	–	8	1	0	4	1	0	5	0	0	39	18	1
~~55~~	MF	Federico Redondo	(Argentina)	20	8	0	–	–	–	8	7	1	4	3	0	3	0	0	35	18	1
Forwards
9	FW	Luis Suárez	(Uruguay)	28	27	10	4	2	0	8	8	3	4	4	1	6	6	3	50	47	17
10	FW	Lionel Messi	(Argentina)	28	26	29	6	6	6	7	6	5	4	4	1	4	4	2	49	46	43
14	FW	Fafà Picault	(Haiti)	20	7	4	0	0	0	3	1	0	3	0	0	2	0	0	28	8	4
21	FW	Tadeo Allende	(Argentina)	31	26	11	6	6	9	7	7	2	4	4	1	6	5	1	54	48	24
24	FW	Mateo Silvetti	(Argentina)	3	1	0	6	4	2	–	–	–	–	–	–	–	–	–	9	5	2
29	FW	Allen Obando	(Ecuador)	6	1	1	0	0	0	1	0	0	0	0	0	0	0	0	7	1	1
56	FW	Dániel Pintér (Note: Player from Inter Miami II)	(United States)	1	0	0	–	–	–	–	–	–	–	–	–	–	–	–	1	0	0
~~22~~	FW	Leo Afonso	(Brazil)	3	1	0	–	–	–	1	0	0	0	0	0	–	–	–	4	1	0
Total				34		81	6		19	8		12	4		4	6		12	58		128

=== Goalscorers ===
Rank	Pos.	No.	Player	MLS	PO	CCC	CWC	LC	Total
1	FW	10	(Argentina) Lionel Messi	29	6	5	1	2	43
2	FW	21	(Argentina) Tadeo Allende	11	9	2	1	1	24
3	FW	9	(Uruguay) Luis Suárez	10	0	3	1	3	17
4	MF	8	(Venezuela) Telasco Segovia	8	1	0	1	3	13
5	DF	18	(Spain) Jordi Alba	6	0	1	0	1	8
6	FW	14	(Haiti) Fafà Picault	4	0	0	0	0	4
7	MF	11	(Argentina) Baltasar Rodríguez	3	0	0	0	0	3
8	DF	6	(Argentina) Tomás Avilés	2	0	0	0	0	2
8	MF	7	(Argentina) Rodrigo De Paul	0	1	0	0	1	2
8	FW	24	(Argentina) Mateo Silvetti	0	2	0	0	0	2
8	DF	57	(Argentina) Marcelo Weigandt	1	0	0	0	1	2
12	MF	42	(Italy) Yannick Bright	1	0	0	0	0	1
12	MF	~~30~~	(United States) Benjamin Cremaschi	1	0	0	0	0	1
12	DF	37	(Uruguay) Maximiliano Falcón	1	0	0	0	0	1
12	DF	17	(Jamaica) Ian Fray	1	0	0	0	0	1
12	DF	~~14~~	(Paraguay) David Martínez	1	0	0	0	0	1
12	FW	29	(Ecuador) Allen Obando	1	0	0	0	0	1
12	MF	~~55~~	(Argentina) Federico Redondo	0	0	1	0	0	1
12	MF	~~16~~	(Finland) Robert Taylor	1	0	0	0	0	1
Own goals				0	1	0	0	0	1
Total				81	20	12	4	12	129

=== Assists ===
Rank	Pos.	No.	Player	MLS	PO	CCC	CWC	LC	Total
1	FW	10	(Argentina) Lionel Messi	16	7	0	0	2	25
2	FW	9	(Uruguay) Luis Suárez	10	1	2	1	3	17
3	DF	18	(Spain) Jordi Alba	11	3	1	0	1	16
4	MF	5	(Spain) Sergio Busquets	8	0	2	0	0	10
5	MF	7	(Argentina) Rodrigo De Paul	3	1	0	0	2	6
6	MF	8	(Venezuela) Telasco Segovia	4	0	0	0	0	4
7	DF	32	(Greece) Noah Allen	1	0	1	1	0	3
7	DF	17	(Jamaica) Ian Fray	1	1	1	0	0	3
7	MF	11	(Argentina) Baltasar Rodríguez	3	0	0	0	0	3
7	DF	57	(Argentina) Marcelo Weigandt	2	0	0	1	0	3
11	FW	21	(Argentina) Tadeo Allende	1	1	0	0	0	2
11	MF	~~30~~	(United States) Benjamin Cremaschi	2	0	0	0	0	2
11	FW	24	(Argentina) Mateo Silvetti	0	2	0	0	0	2
14	MF	42	(Italy) Yannick Bright	0	1	0	0	0	1
14	DF	2	(Argentina) Gonzalo Luján	1	0	0	0	0	1
14	MF	81	(United States) Santiago Morales	0	0	1	0	0	1
14	MF	~~55~~	(Argentina) Federico Redondo	1	0	0	0	0	1
Total				64	17	8	3	8	100

=== Clean sheets ===
Rank	No.	Player	MLS	PO	CCC	CWC	LC	Total
1	19	(Argentina) Oscar Ustari	3	0	3	1	0	7
2	34	(Argentina) Rocco Ríos Novo	2	2	0	0	0	4
Total			5	2	3	1	0	11

== Player awards ==
=== MLS Team of the Matchday ===
Week	Player(s)	Opponent(s)
1	XI: Lionel Messi	New York City FC
2	XI: Telasco Segovia, Luis Suárez	Houston Dynamo FC
3	XI: Yannick Bright; Bench: Noah Allen, Tadeo Allende	Charlotte FC
4	XI: Lionel Messi	Atlanta United FC
6	Bench: Lionel Messi	Philadelphia Union
8	Bench: Oscar Ustari	Chicago Fire FC
9	XI: Marcelo Weigandt, Benjamin Cremaschi	Columbus Crew
11	XI: Marcelo Weigandt	New York Red Bulls
13	XI: Tadeo Allende; Bench: Jordi Alba	San Jose Earthquakes
15	XI: Lionel Messi	Philadelphia Union
16	XI: Lionel Messi, Luis Suárez	CF Montréal
17	XI: Lionel Messi; Coach: Javier Mascherano	Columbus Crew
22	XI: Lionel Messi; Bench: Oscar Ustari, Tadeo Allende	CF Montréal
24	XI: Lionel Messi	Nashville SC
26	XI: Lionel Messi, Telasco Segovia, Jordi Alba; Coach: Javier Mascherano	New York Red Bulls
27	XI: Benjamin Cremaschi	FC Cincinnati
29	XI: Lionel Messi, Jordi Alba; Bench: Luis Suárez	LA Galaxy
