= Gonzalo Luján =

Argentine footballer (born 2001)

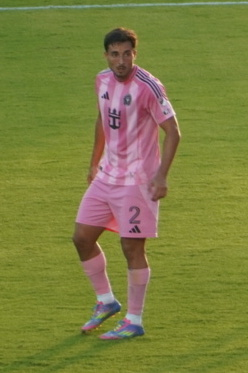
- Luján with Inter Miami in 2025

Personal information
- Full name: Gonzalo Luján Melli
- Date of birth: 27 April 2001 (age 25)
- Place of birth: Buenos Aires, Argentina
- Height: 1.82 m (6 ft 0 in)
- Position: Defender

Team information
- Current team: Inter Miami
- Number: 2

Youth career
- –2021: San Lorenzo

Senior career*
Years	Team	Apps	(Gls)
2021–2024	San Lorenzo	78	(0)
2025–	Inter Miami	25	(1)
- * Club domestic league appearances and goals as of 5 October 2025

Gonzalo Luján Melli (born 27 April 2001) is an Argentine professional footballer who plays as a defender in Major League Soccer for Inter Miami.

== Club career ==
=== San Lorenzo ===
Luján came through the San Lorenzo youth teams. He made his debut in the first team on 26 May 2021 against Chilean side Huachipato FC in the Copa Sudamericana. Later that season, after a succession of substitute appearances, he made his first league start against Newells Old Boys. Luján signed a new contract with the club in December 2021, agreeing to a one-year deal. In March 2022, Luján renewed his contract with the club, signing on until December 2024. The new contract came just 92 days after the previous deal, and came after negative feedback from the fans that the club had only agreed a one-year deal, initially.

=== Inter Miami ===
On 16 January 2025, Luján signed a three-year deal with Major League Soccer side Inter Miami for an undisclosed transfer fee. When he signed for Inter Miami, he reunited with his former coach Javier Mascherano from the Olympics. He would make his debut coming on for Benjamin Cremaschi in Inter Miami's opening match against New York City on 22 February it resulted in a 2–2 draw. He would get his first start for the team on 2 March in a 4–1 win against Houston Dynamo.

== International career ==
In November 2023, Luján was called up to the Argentina national under-23 football team by coach Javier Mascherano. In June 2024, he was named in the provisional Argentina squad for the 2024 Paris Olympics.

== Career statistics ==
As of match played 16 March 2025

Club	Season	League			National cup (Note: Includes Copa del Rey, U.S. Open Cup)		Continental		Other		Total	
Club	Season	Division	Apps	Goals	Apps	Goals	Apps	Goals	Apps	Goals	Apps	Goals
San Lorenzo	2021	Argentine Primera División	5	0	0	0	1	0	—		6	0
San Lorenzo	2022	Argentine Primera División	13	0	0	0	0	0	—		13	0
San Lorenzo	2023	Argentine Primera División	31	0	2	0	8	0	—		41	0
San Lorenzo	2024	Argentine Primera División	28	0	1	0	7	0	—		36	0
San Lorenzo	Total		78	0	3	0	16	0	—		96	0
Inter Miami	2025	Major League Soccer	5	0	0	0	5	0			10	0
Career total			83	0	79	1	19	0	—		105	0

== Honours ==
Inter Miami

- MLS Cup: 2025
- Campeones Cup: 2026
