= Federico Redondo =

Argentine footballer

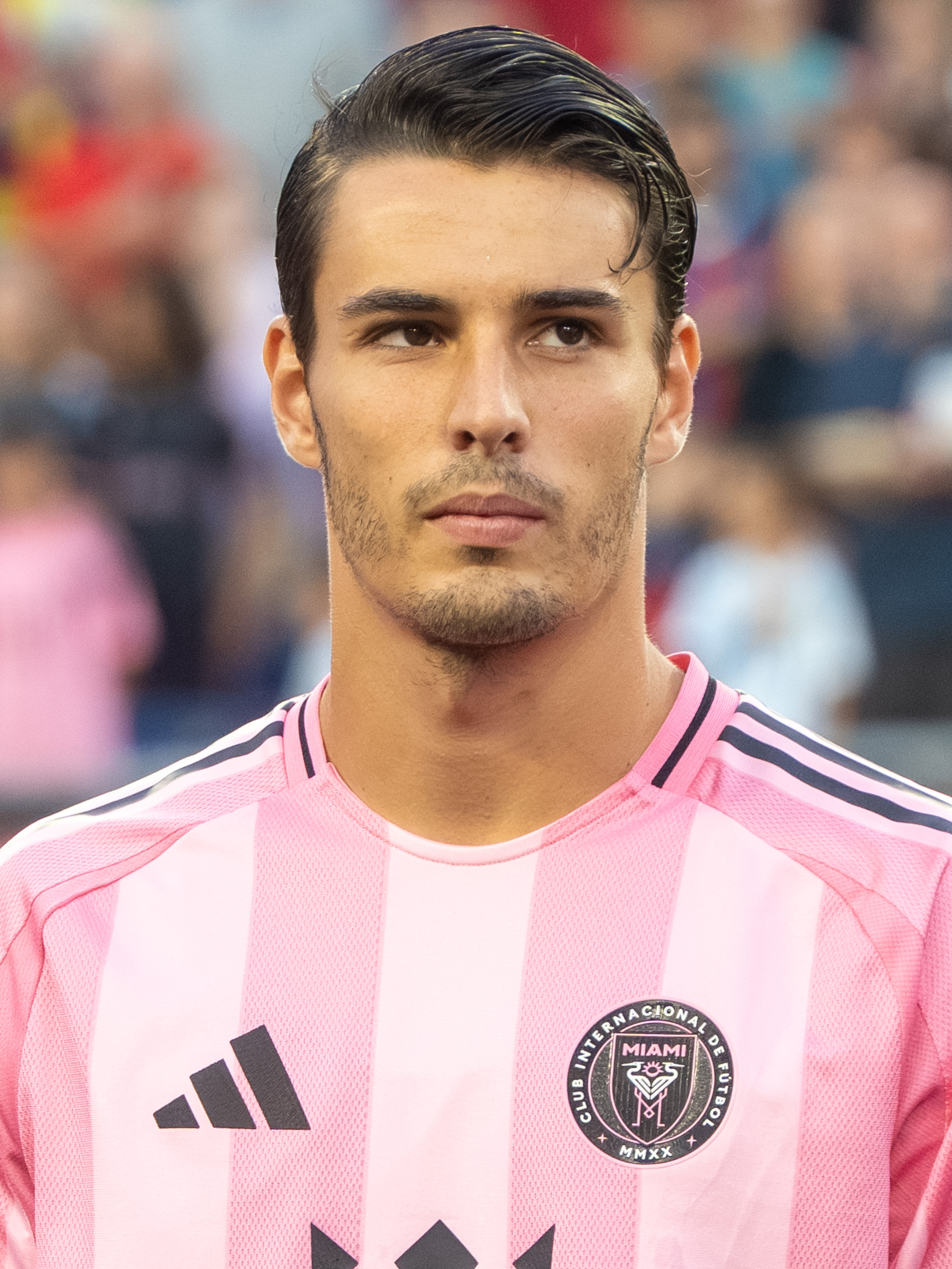
- Redondo with Inter Miami in 2025

Personal information
- Full name: Federico Redondo Solari
- Date of birth: 18 January 2003 (age 23)
- Place of birth: Madrid, Spain
- Height: 1.88 m (6 ft 2 in)
- Position: Defensive midfielder

Team information
- Current team: Elche
- Number: 5

Youth career
- 2013–2022: Argentinos Juniors

Senior career*
Years	Team	Apps	(Gls)
2022–2024	Argentinos Juniors	49	(2)
2024–2025	Inter Miami	36	(2)
2025–	Elche	11	(1)

International career^{‡}
2022–2023	Argentina U20	9	(0)
2024–	Argentina U23	11	(1)
- * Club domestic league appearances and goals as of 11 April 2026 ‡ National team caps and goals as of 23 March 2024

Federico Redondo Solari (born 18 January 2003) is an Argentine professional footballer who plays as a defensive midfielder for La Liga club Elche. The son of Fernando Redondo, Federico was born in Spain and is a youth international for Argentina.

== Club career ==
=== Argentinos Juniors ===
Redondo is a youth product of the academy of Argentinos Juniors since the age of 10. He signed his first professional contract with them on 17 December 2021, keeping him at the club until December 2023. He debuted with Argentinos Juniors in a 2–1 Argentine Primera División win over Tigre on 11 July 2022, coming on as a substitute in extra time. He ended his spell at Argentinos Juniors with two goals in 59 appearances in all competitions.

=== Inter Miami ===
On 23 February 2024, Redondo completed his transfer to Major League Soccer club Inter Miami, signing a contract that extends through the 2027 season, with an option for the club to extend it through 2028. He joined the club under the U22 Initiative, brought in as a season-ending injury replacement for another U22 Initiative player, Facundo Farías. The transfer was contingent upon the successful receipt of his International Transfer Certificate (ITC) and P-1 visa, formalities necessary for players moving between countries and competing in the United States, respectively.

=== Elche ===
On 14 August 2025, La Liga club Elche announced the signing of Redondo on a five-year contract.

== International career ==
Redondo is a youth international for Argentina, having represented the Argentina U20s in May 2022.

On 10 January 2024, Redondo was called up for the Argentina Olympic team for the 2024 CONMEBOL Pre-Olympic Tournament.

== Style of play ==
Redondo usually plays as a defensive midfielder or number five in front of the back-line, but normally operates as a deep-lying playmaker in midfield, due to his passing, vision, technique, positioning, and his ability to dictate the tempo of his team's play, which allows him to link-up the defense and the attack effectively after winning back possession. Considered to be a classy and promising young player in the media, his playing style, reading of the game, height, and physique have led pundits to liken him to his father, Fernando, as well as Spanish midfielder Sergio Busquets.

== Personal life ==
Redondo was born in Spain and is of Argentine descent, returning to Argentina at a young age. His father Fernando played in the same position as him most notably for Real Madrid, AC Milan and the Argentine national team, while his brother Fernando Redondo Solari was also briefly a professional footballer. Through his mother, he is the grandson of former footballer Jorge Solari, as well as a nephew of both Santiago Solari, who also played for Real Madrid, and Esteban Solari.

== Career statistics ==
As of match played 23 May 2026

Appearances and goals by club, season and competition
Club	Season	League			Playoffs		National cup (Note: Includes Copa Argentina, Copa del Rey)		Continental		Other		Total	
Club	Season	Division	Apps	Goals	Apps	Goals	Apps	Goals	Apps	Goals	Apps	Goals	Apps	Goals
Argentinos Juniors	2021	Argentine Primera División	0	0	—		0	0	0	0	—		0	0
Argentinos Juniors	2022	Argentine Primera División	14	0	—		0	0	—		—		14	0
Argentinos Juniors	2023	Argentine Primera División	35	2	—		3	0	7 (Note: Appearances in Copa Libertadores)	0	—		45	2
Argentinos Juniors	Total		49	2	—		3	0	7	0	—		59	2
Inter Miami	2024	MLS	16	2	3	0	—		2 (Note: Appearances in CONCACAF Champions Cup)	0	4 (Note: Appearances in Leagues Cup)	0	25	2
Inter Miami	2025	MLS	20	0	—		—		8	1	7 (Note: Four appearances in FIFA Club World Cup, three appearances in Leagues Cup)	0	35	1
Inter Miami	Total		36	2	3	0	—		10	1	11	0	60	3
Elche	2025–26	La Liga	11	0	—		4	1	—		—		15	1
Career total			96	4	3	0	7	1	17	1	11	0	134	5

== Honours ==
Inter Miami

- Supporters' Shield: 2024
