= Fernando Redondo (footballer, born 1994) =

Argentine footballer

Personal information
- Full name: Fernando Redondo Solari
- Date of birth: 15 September 1994 (age 32)
- Place of birth: Madrid, España
- Position: Midfielder

Senior career*
Years	Team	Apps	(Gls)
2016–2017	Tigre	1	(0)
- * Club domestic league appearances and goals as of 21:28, 15 May 2017 (UTC)

Fernando Redondo Solari (born 15 September 1994) is an Argentine former professional footballer who played as a midfielder for Tigre.

== Career ==
Redondo's professional club career began with Argentinos Juniors and All Boys, and then he ended up in Tigre.

He debuted on March 21, 2016, against Newell's Old Boys, replacing Ezequiel Cirigliano at 26' of the second half in the Argentine Primera División, wearing the Tigre shirt.

In August 2016 he suffered a rupture of the anterior cruciate ligament in his right knee, for which he decided to abandon professional football.

He is the son of former football player Fernando Redondo and brother of Federico Redondo.
