= Lucas Rodriguez Pagano =

Argentine footballer

Personal information
- Full name: Lucas Omar Rodriguez Pagano
- Date of birth: April 22, 1980 (age 46)
- Place of birth: Buenos Aires, Argentina
- Height: 1.71 m (5 ft 7 in)
- Position: Defender

Team information
- Current team: Inter Miami (assistant manager)

Senior career*
Years	Team	Apps	(Gls)
2000–2001	Corinthians		
2001–2002	Fortuna Köln	14	(0)
2002–2003	Deportivo Morón		
2003	Chacarita Juniors	7	(0)
2004	Independiente Rivadavia		
2004	Libertad		
2005	Temperley		
2005–2006	Unión Santa Fe	27	(1)
2006–2007	Ferro Carril Oeste	25	(0)
2007–2008	Olympiakos Nicosia	20	(0)
2008–2009	Tiro Federal	5	(0)
2009–2010	Olimpo	10	(0)
2010	Unión Villa Krause		
2011–2012	San Telmo		
2012–2013	Deportivo Morón	23	(1)
2013–2014	Colegiales	23	(0)

Managerial career
- 2016–2017: Vélez Sarsfield (assistant)
- 2022: Rosario Central (assistant)
- 2022: Aldovisi (assistant)
- 2022–2024: Argentina U20 (assistant)
- 2023–2024: Argentina U23 (assistant)
- 2024–: Inter Miami (assistant)
- * Club domestic league appearances and goals as of 29 August 2007

Lucas Omar Rodriguez Pagano (born April 22, 1980) is an Argentine professional football coach and former player who played as a defender. He is currently assistant manager of Major League Soccer club Inter Miami.

== Career ==
Rodriguez Pagano started his career in Brazil with Corinthians, but mainly played in Argentina. He also played for German club Fortuna Köln, Paraguayan club Libertad and Cypriot club Olympiakos Nicosia.

== Honours ==
Olimpia

- Primera Nacional: 2009–10
