= Telasco Segovia =

Venezuelan footballer (born 2003)

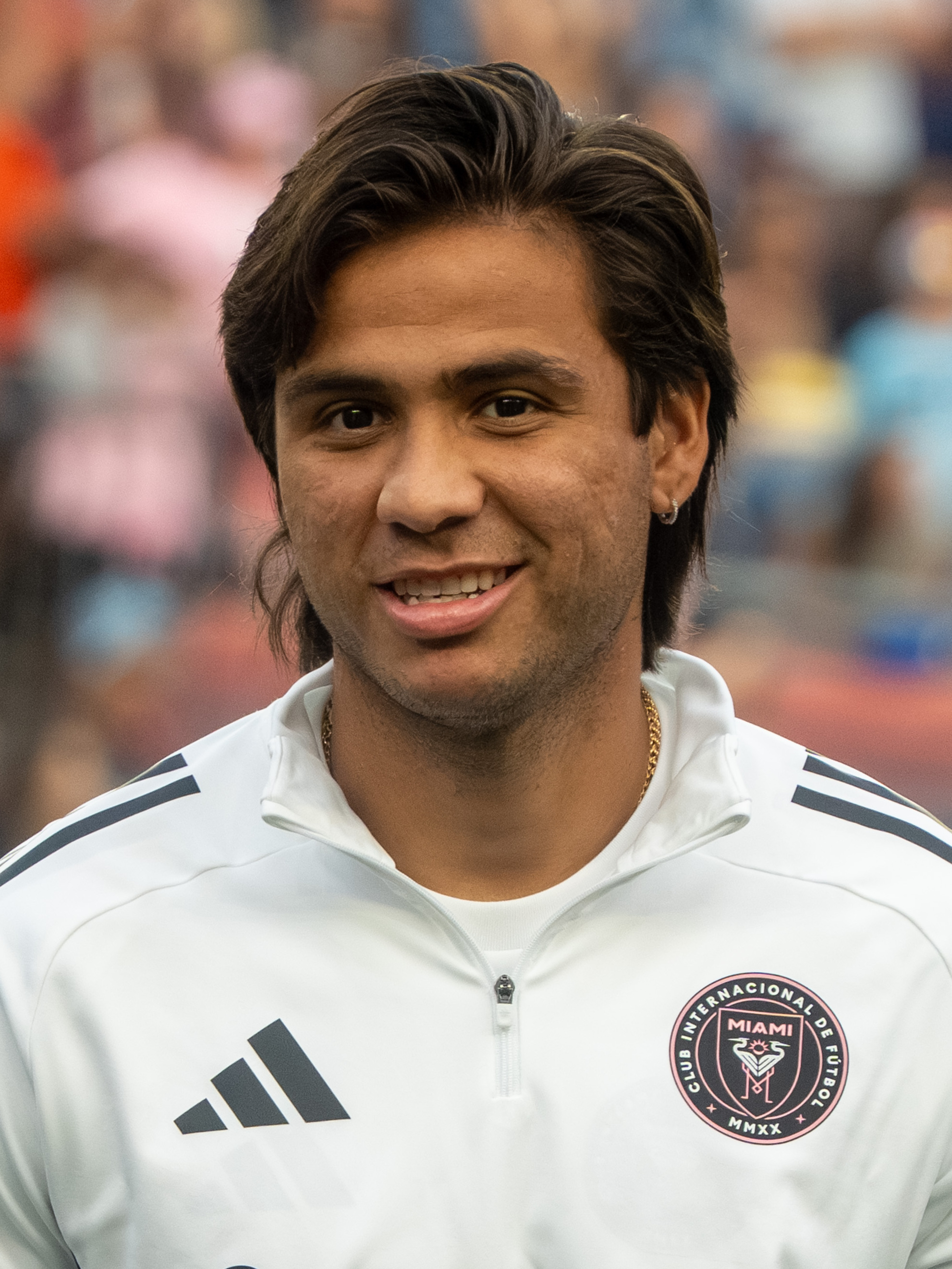
- Segovia with Inter Miami in 2025

Personal information
- Full name: Telasco José Segovia Pérez
- Date of birth: 2 April 2003 (age 23)
- Place of birth: Barquisimeto, Venezuela
- Height: 1.80 m (5 ft 11 in)
- Position: Midfielder

Team information
- Current team: Inter Miami
- Number: 8

Youth career
- Deportivo Lara

Senior career*
Years	Team	Apps	(Gls)
2019–2023	Deportivo Lara	58	(6)
2022–2023	→ Sampdoria (loan)	1	(0)
2023–2025	Casa Pia	31	(2)
2025–	Inter Miami	61	(11)

International career^{‡}
2022	Venezuela U20	16	(2)
2022	Venezuela U21	5	(2)
2024	Venezuela U23	7	(2)
2022–	Venezuela	21	(2)
Medal record
Men's football
Representing Venezuela
FIFA Series
Runner-up	2026 Uzbekistan
- * Club domestic league appearances and goals as of 7 November 2026 ‡ National team caps and goals as of 23:24, 17 November 2026 (UTC)

Telasco José Segovia Pérez (born 2 April 2003) is a Venezuelan professional footballer who plays as a midfielder for Major League Soccer club Inter Miami and the Venezuela national team.

== Club career ==
=== Deportivo Lara ===
Segovia made his professional debut with Deportivo Lara in a 3–1 Venezuelan Primera División loss to Carabobo on 8 September 2019. On 9 March 2021, he debuted in Copa Libertadores in a 2–1 loss to Santos.

=== Sampdoria ===
On 10 August 2022, Segovia joined Sampdoria in Italy on loan with an option to buy. Segovia signed a four-year contract with the club in case the option was exercised.

At the end of the 2022–23 season, Sampdoria got relegated to the Serie B, blocking Segovia's permanent move to the club. However, his parent club Deportivo Lara was unable to enter any competition for the 2023 season due to administrative reasons, leaving Segovia without a club.

=== Casa Pia ===
On 26 September 2023, Segovia signed a three-year contract with Portuguese Primeira Liga club Casa Pia.

=== Inter Miami ===
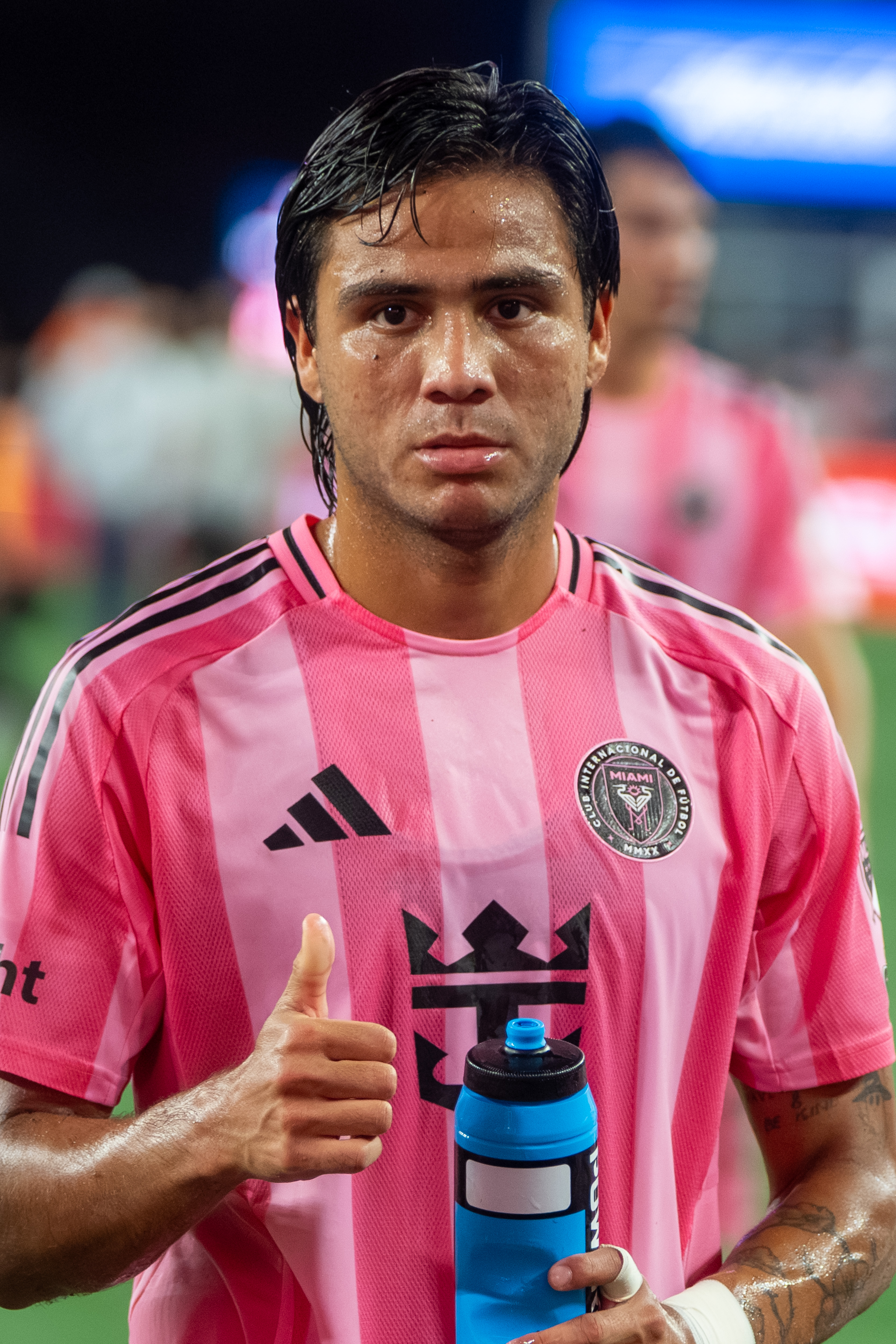
Segovia with Inter Miami in 2025

On 17 January 2025, Segovia moved to the United States, joining Major League Soccer side Inter Miami on a four-year deal. He substituted Luis Suárez and scored the equalizer goal for the club on 22 February 2025 which assisted by Lionel Messi in the first match of 2025/26 MLS league againest New York City FC.

== International career ==
Segovia made his debut for the Venezuela national team on 28 January 2022 as an 85th-minute substitute for Darwin Machís in a 4–1 home win over Bolivia. He has also played for the national under-20 squad as well as the Venezuela under-23 football team. He scored a goal against Brazil on 14 November 2024 two minutes after getting subbed on during World Cup 2026 elimination game.

== Career statistics ==
=== Club ===
As of match played 21 November 2026

Appearances and goals by club, season and competition
Club	Season	League			National cup		League cup		Continental		Other		Total	
Club	Season	Division	Apps	Goals	Apps	Goals	Apps	Goals	Apps	Goals	Apps	Goals	Apps	Goals
Deportivo Lara	2019	Liga FUTVE	1	0	0	0	—		—		—		1	0
Deportivo Lara	2020	Liga FUTVE	16	0	0	0	—		—		—		16	0
Deportivo Lara	2021	Liga FUTVE	31	3	0	0	—		2 (Note: Appearances in Copa Libertadores)	0	—		33	3
Deportivo Lara	2022	Liga FUTVE	10	3	0	0	—		2	0	—		12	3
Deportivo Lara	Total		58	6	0	0	—		4	0	—		62	6
Sampdoria (loan)	2022–23	Serie A	1	0	0	0	—		—		—		1	0
Casa Pia	2023–24	Primeira Liga	16	0	1	0	0	0	—		—		17	0
Casa Pia	2024–25	Primeira Liga	15	2	0	0	0	0	—		—		15	2
Casa Pia	Total		31	2	1	0	0	0	—		—		32	2
Inter Miami	2025	Major League Soccer	31	8	—		—		8 (Note: Appearances in CONCACAF Champions Cup)	0	16 (Note: Four appearances and one goal in FIFA Club World Cup, six appearances and three goals in Leagues Cup, six appearances and one goal in MLS Cup playoffs)	5	55	13
Inter Miami	2026	Major League Soccer	30	3	—		—		2	0	4 (Note: Three appearances and one goal in Leagues Cup, one appearance in MLS Cup playoffs)	1	36	4
Inter Miami	Total		61	11	—		—		10	0	20	6	91	17
Career total			149	18	1	0	0	0	14	0	20	6	186	24

=== International ===
As of match played 17 November 2026

Appearances and goals by national team and year
National team	Year	Apps	Goals
Venezuela	2022	1	0
Venezuela	2023	1	0
Venezuela	2024	6	1
Venezuela	2025	8	1
Venezuela	2026	5	0
Total		21	2

Scores and results list Venezuela's goal tally first, score column indicates score after each Segovia goal.

List of international goals scored by Telasco Segovia
No.	Date	Venue	Opponent	Score	Result	Competition
1	14 November 2024	Estadio Monumental, Maturín, Venezuela	Brazil	1–1	1–1	2026 FIFA World Cup qualification
2	9 September 2025	Estadio Monumental, Maturín, Venezuela	Colombia	1–0	3–6	2026 FIFA World Cup qualification

== Honours ==
Inter Miami

- MLS Cup: 2025
- Eastern Conference (MLS): 2025

Venezuela

- FIFA Series runner-up: 2026

Individual

- Maurice Revello Tournament Golden Ball: 2022
- Maurice Revello Tournament Best XI: 2022
