= Tadeo Allende =

Argentine footballer (born 1999)

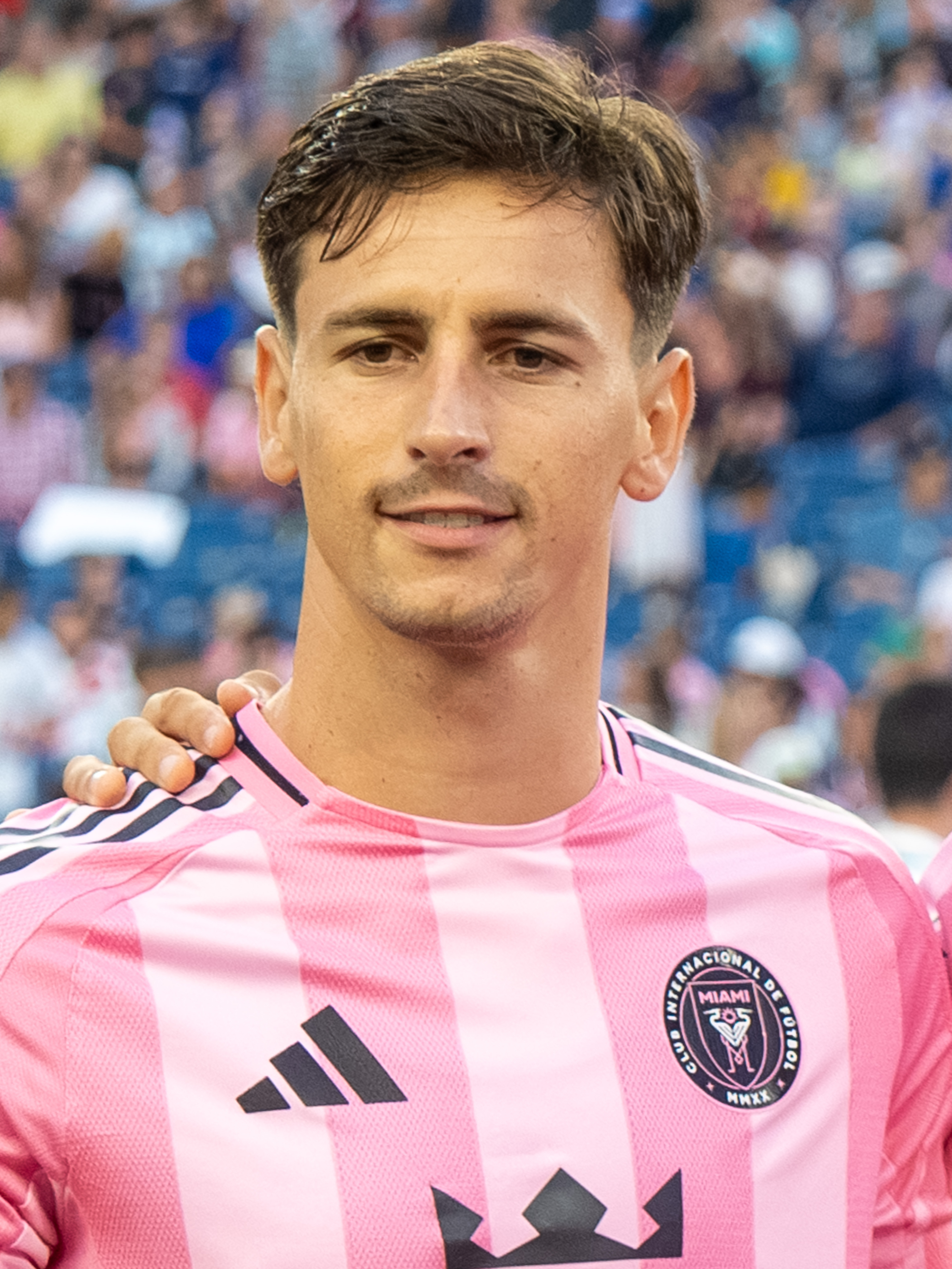
- Allende with Inter Miami in 2025

Personal information
- Full name: Tadeo Allende
- Date of birth: 20 February 1999 (age 27)
- Place of birth: Mina Clavero, Argentina
- Height: 1.85 m (6 ft 1 in)
- Position: Winger

Team information
- Current team: Inter Miami
- Number: 21

Youth career
- Juventud Unida de Mina Clavero
- 2017–2020: Instituto

Senior career*
Years	Team	Apps	(Gls)
2021–2022	Instituto	24	(0)
2022	→ Godoy Cruz (loan)	13	(0)
2022–2023	Godoy Cruz	62	(13)
2024–2026	Celta Vigo	11	(1)
2025	→ Inter Miami (loan)	31	(11)
2026–	Inter Miami	1	(0)
- * Club domestic league appearances and goals as of 08:51, 26 February 2025 (UTC)

Tadeo Allende (born 20 February 1999) is an Argentine professional footballer who plays as a winger for Major League Soccer club Inter Miami.

== Career ==
=== Instituto ===
Born in Mina Clavero, Córdoba, Allende began his career with hometown side CA Juventud Unida before joining Instituto's youth sides in 2017; initially a striker, he would progress in the youth categories as a winger. In March 2021, he signed his first professional contract with the latter club, being promoted to the first team.

Allende made his senior debut on 13 March 2021, starting in a 0–0 Primera Nacional away draw against Defensores de Belgrano.

=== Godoy Cruz ===
On 20 January 2022, Allende moved to Primera División side Godoy Cruz on a one-year loan deal, with a buyout clause. He made his debut in the category on 11 February, starting in a 1–1 home draw against Tigre.

On 14 June 2022, Godoy Cruz bought 50% of Allende's economic rights for a rumoured fee of US$ 300,000, with Allende signing a contract until 2026. He scored his first professional goal on 2 July, netting the winner in a 1–0 home success over Colón.

A regular starter during the 2023 season, Allende scored ten goals during the year, only missing out a few matches due to a knee injury.

=== Celta ===
On 31 January 2024, Allende signed a four-and-a-half-year contract with Spanish La Liga side Celta de Vigo.

==== Inter Miami ====
On 14 January 2025, Allende was loaned to Major League Soccer side Inter Miami for their 2025 season. He emerged as one of the leading offensive players for Miami, finishing the regular season with 11 goals and one assist, often starting along Lionel Messi and Luis Suárez. In the MLS Cup Playoffs, he set a postseason record with nine goals and finished as the tournament's top goalscorer as the team went on to win the MLS Cup. He did return to Celta Vigo initially after his loan expired.

On 26 January 2026, Allende signed for Inter Miami permanently, after a successful loan deal. After experiencing prolonged knee issues, he underwent surgery in spring of 2026 and was placed on the longterm injury list.

== Personal life ==
Born in Argentina, Allende is of Italian descent and holds dual Argentine and Italian citizenship.

== Career statistics ==
As of match played 6 December 2025

Appearances and goals by club, season and competition
Club	Season	League			National cup (Note: Includes Copa del Rey)		Continental		Other		Total	
Club	Season	Division	Apps	Goals	Apps	Goals	Apps	Goals	Apps	Goals	Apps	Goals
Celta de Vigo	2023–24	La Liga	10	1	–		–		–		10	1
Celta de Vigo	2024–25	La Liga	1	0	2	2	–		–		3	2
Celta de Vigo	Total		11	1	2	2	–		–		13	3
Inter Miami (loan)	2025	MLS	31	11	–		7 (Note: Appearances in CONCACAF Champions Cup)	2	16 (Note: Six appearances and one goal in Leagues Cup, four appearances and one goal in FIFA Club World Cup, six appearances and nine goals in MLS Cup playoffs)	11	54	24
Inter Miami	2026	MLS	1	0	–		0	0	–		1	0
Career total			43	12	2	2	7	2	16	11	68	27

== Honours ==
Inter Miami

- MLS Cup: 2025
- Eastern Conference (Playoffs): 2025

Individual

- MLS Cup playoffs top scorer: 2025
