= Mateo Silvetti =

Argentine footballer (born 2006)

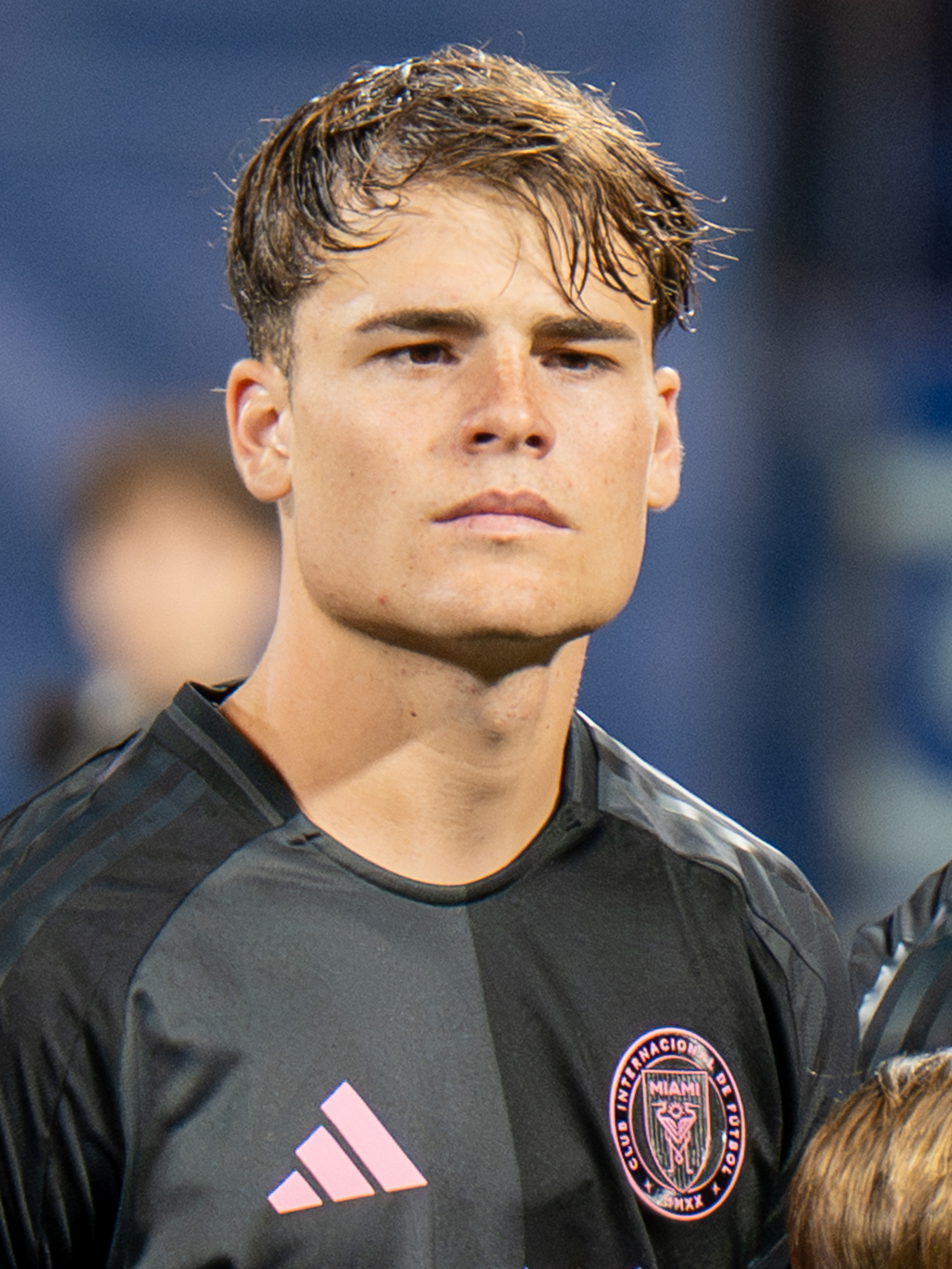
- Silvetti with Inter Miami in 2025

Personal information
- Date of birth: 14 January 2006 (age 20)
- Place of birth: Rosario, Argentina
- Height: 1.75 m (5 ft 9 in)
- Positions: Winger; attacking midfielder; wide midfielder

Team information
- Current team: Inter Miami
- Number: 24

Senior career*
Years	Team	Apps	(Gls)
2024–2025	Newell's Old Boys	35	(6)
2025–	Inter Miami	19	(5)

International career
2024–	Argentina U20	9	(4)
Medal record
Men's football
Representing Argentina
FIFA U-20 World Cup
Runner-up	2025 Chile
- * Club domestic league appearances and goals as of 25 September 2025 (UTC)

Mateo Silvetti (born 14 January 2006) is an Argentine professional footballer who plays as a winger, attacking midfielder, or wide midfielder for Major League Soccer club Inter Miami.

== Club career ==
He joined the football academy at Newell's Old Boys in 2014. He was part of a successful Newells U17 team and at the end of 2023 signed a contract until December 2025. He was promoted to train with the Newell's Old Boys first-team in the summer of 2024 and made his Argentine Primera División debut for Newell's Old Boys on 19 July 2024, against Barracas Central at the age of 18 years-old.

He scored his first league goals for the club when he struck a brace on the 27 September 2024 in a 3–3 draw against Deportivo Riestra.

On 22 August 2025, it was announced that Silvetti had signed with Inter Miami of Major League Soccer through the 2029 season with an option for a further year, as part of their U22 Initiative. On 6 December, he started the final as Inter Miami won the MLS Cup 2025 against Vancouver Whitecaps.

== International career ==
In 2022 and 2023 he was called up by Argentina U17. In August 2024, he was called up to the Argentina national under-20 football team. He was part of the team which reached the final of the 2025 FIFA U-20 World Cup.

== Career Statistics ==
=== Club ===
As of match played 23 July 2026

Appearances and goals by club, season and competition
Club	Season	League			National cup (Note: Includes Copa Argentina)		League cup		Continental		Other		Total	
Club	Season	Division	Apps	Goals	Apps	Goals	Apps	Goals	Apps	Goals	Apps	Goals	Apps	Goals
Newell's Old Boys	2024	Liga Profesional	20	4	1	0	—		—		—		21	4
Newell's Old Boys	2025	Liga Profesional	15	2	1	0	—		—		—		16	2
Newell's Old Boys	Total		35	6	2	0	0	0	0	0	0	0	37	6
Inter Miami	2025	MLS	9	2	—		—		—		—		9	2
Inter Miami	2026	MLS	10	3	—		—		2 (Note: Appearances in CONCACAF Champions Cup)	0	—		12	3
Inter Miami	Total		19	5	0	0	0	0	2	0	0	0	21	5
Career total			54	11	2	0	0	0	2	0	0	0	58	11

=== International ===
As of match played 20 October 2025

Appearances and goals by national team and year
National team	Year	Apps	Goals
Argentina U20	2024	3	1
Argentina U20	2025	6	3
Total		9	4

== Honours ==
Inter Miami

- MLS Cup: 2025

Argentina U20

- FIFA U-20 World Cup runner-up: 2025
