= Maximiliano Falcón =

Uruguayan footballer (born 1997)

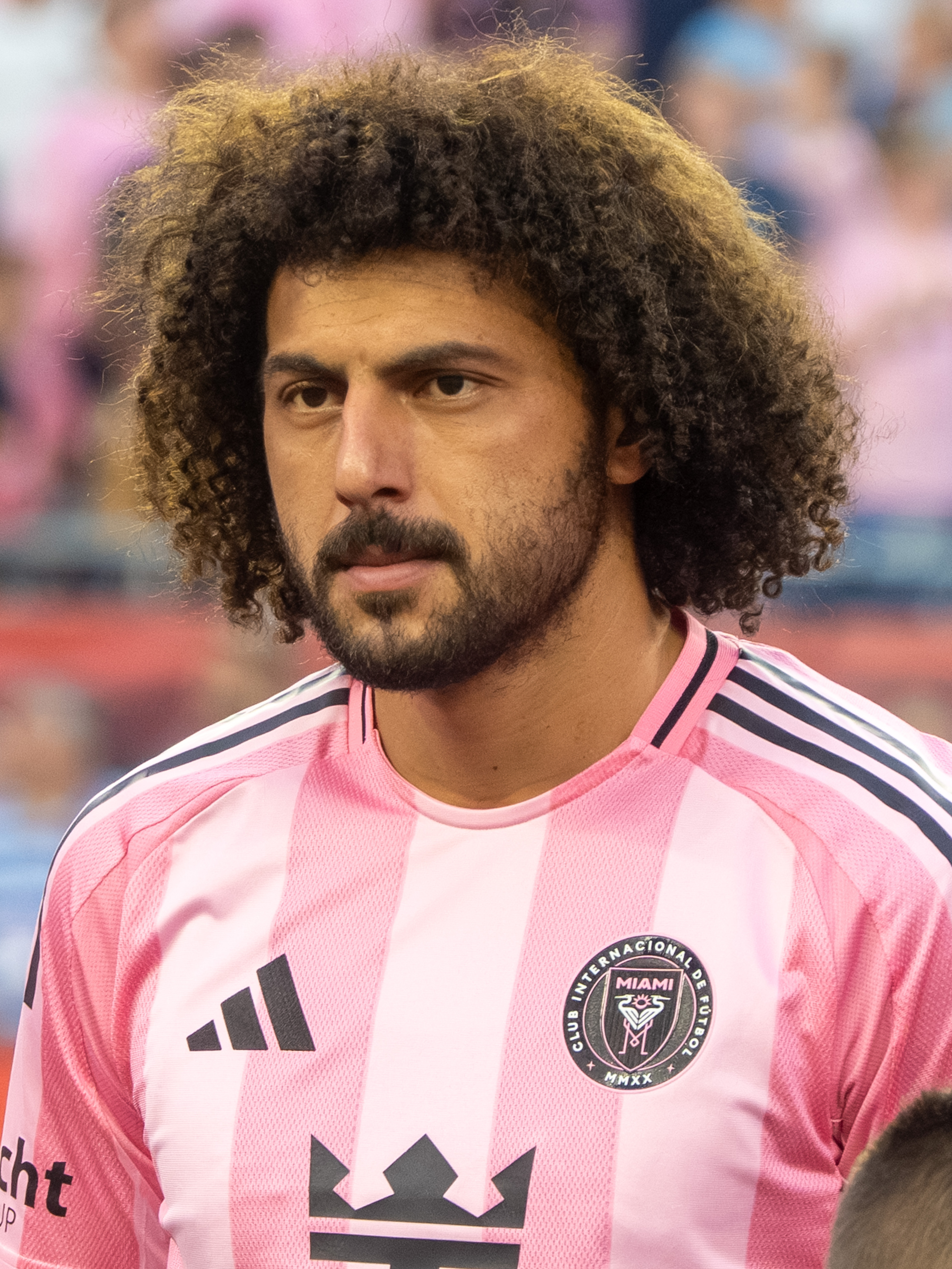
- Falcón with Inter Miami in 2025

Personal information
- Full name: Maximiliano Joel Falcón Picart
- Date of birth: 1 May 1997 (age 29)
- Place of birth: Paysandú, Uruguay
- Height: 1.80 m (5 ft 11 in)
- Position: Defender

Team information
- Current team: Inter Miami
- Number: 37

Youth career
- Nacional

Senior career*
Years	Team	Apps	(Gls)
2019–2020	Rentistas	32	(3)
2020–2024	Colo-Colo	104	(5)
2025–	Inter Miami	44	(1)

International career
2016	Uruguay U20	5	(1)
- * Club domestic league appearances and goals as of 06 September 2026

Maximiliano Joel Falcón Picart (born 1 May 1997) is a Uruguayan professional footballer who plays as a defender for Major League Soccer club Inter Miami CF.

== Club career ==
A former youth academy player of Nacional, Falcón joined Rentistas in 2019. He made his professional debut for the club on 11 May 2019, coming on as an early substitute in a 1–0 home victory over Cerrito.

In 2020 he would sign for Chilean Primera División club Colo-Colo.

On 1 February 2025, Falcón would sign a three-year contract for MLS club Inter Miami. On 25 February, he would make his debut for the club in the CONCACAF Champions Cup first round, second leg game against Sporting Kansas City, which resulted in a 3–1 win.

== International career ==
Falcón is a former Uruguay youth international and have played for under-20 team in few friendlies. On 5 March 2021, he was named in Uruguay senior team's 35-man preliminary squad for 2022 FIFA World Cup qualifying matches against Argentina and Bolivia. However, CONMEBOL suspended those matches next day amid concern over the COVID-19 pandemic.

== Career statistics ==
=== Club ===
As of match played on 21 March 2021

Appearances and goals by club, season and competition
Club	Season	League			Cup		Continental		Other		Total	
Club	Season	Division	Apps	Goals	Apps	Goals	Apps	Goals	Apps	Goals	Apps	Goals
Rentistas	2019	Uruguayan Segunda División	17	1	—		—		4 (Note: Appearances in Segunda División play-offs)	0	21	1
Rentistas	2020	Uruguayan Primera División	15	2	—		—		1 (Note: Appearance in Torneo Intermedio final)	0	16	2
Rentistas	Total		32	3	0	0	0	0	5	0	37	3
Colo-Colo	2020	Chilean Primera División	17	1	1	0	—		1 (Note: Appearance in relegation play-off)	0	19	1
Colo-Colo	2021	Chilean Primera División	19	2	6	0	—		0	0	24	2
Colo-Colo	2022	Chilean Primera División	25	0	4	1	8	0	0	0	37	1
Colo-Colo	2023	Chilean Primera División	21	0	6	1	7	0	0	0	34	1
Colo-Colo	2024	Chilean Primera División	22	2	5	0	13	1	0	0	40	3
Colo-Colo	Total		104	5	22	2	28	1	1	0	154	8
Inter Miami	2025	MLS	0	0	0	0	2	0	0	0	2	0
Career total			136	8	22	2	30	1	6	0	191	11

== Honours ==
Rentistas

- Torneo Apertura: 2020

Colo-Colo

- Copa Chile: 2021, 2023
- Supercopa de Chile: 2022, 2024

Inter Miami

- MLS Cup: 2025
- Eastern Conference (MLS): 2025
- Campeones Cup: 2026
