= Benjamin Cremaschi =

American soccer player (born 2005)

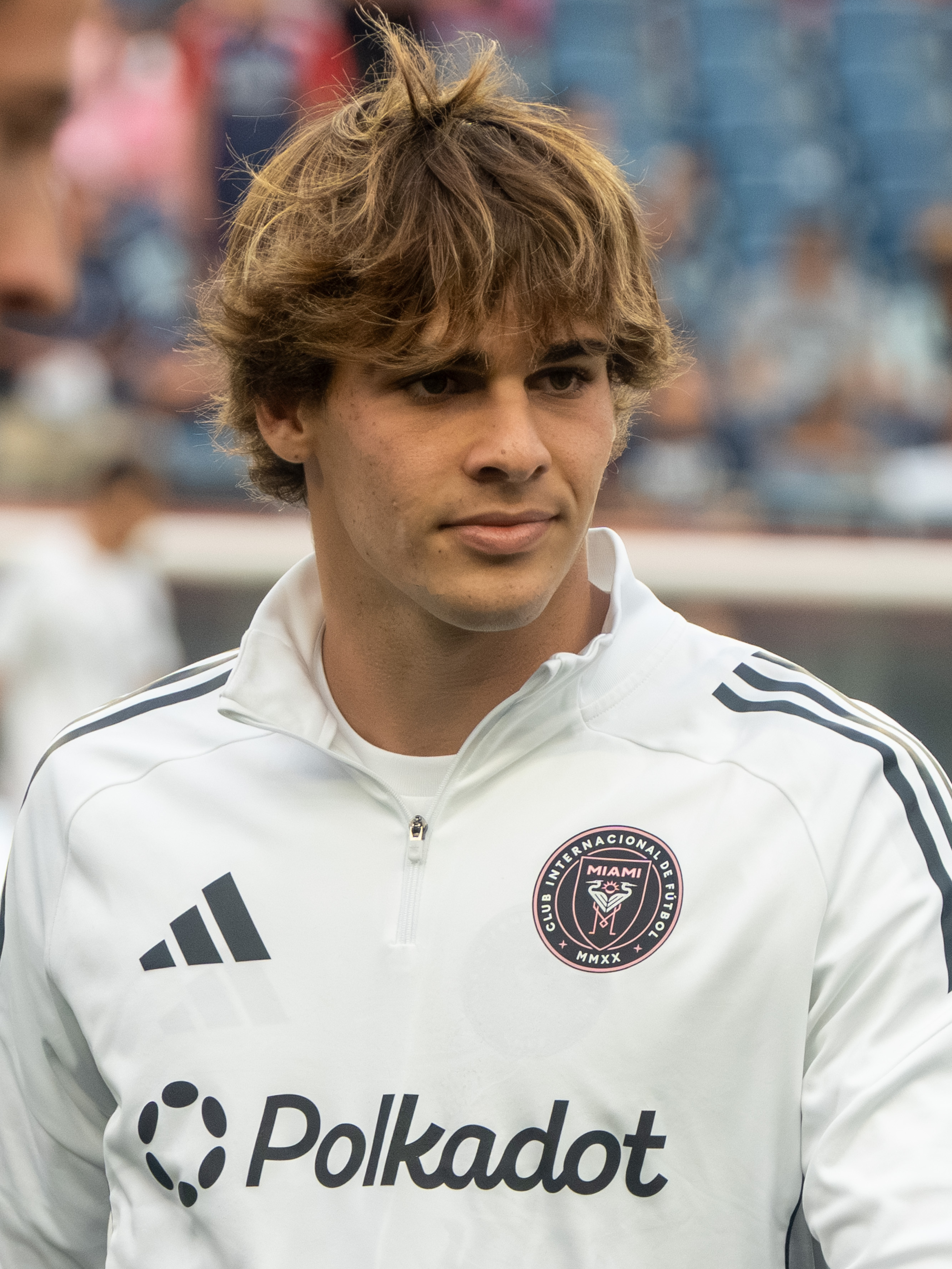
- Cremaschi with Inter Miami in 2025

Personal information
- Full name: Benjamin Cremaschi
- Date of birth: March 2, 2005 (age 21)
- Place of birth: Miami, Florida, U.S.
- Height: 5 ft 11 in (1.80 m)
- Position: Midfielder

Team information
- Current team: Parma
- Number: 8

Youth career
- 2012–2018: Key Biscayne SC
- 2018–2021: Weston FC
- 2021–2022: Inter Miami

Senior career*
Years	Team	Apps	(Gls)
2022	Inter Miami II	13	(5)
2022–2026	Inter Miami	72	(7)
2023–2024	→ Inter Miami II (loan)	6	(0)
2025–2026	→ Parma (loan)	8	(0)
2026–	Parma	3	(0)

International career^{‡}
2022	United States U19	3	(2)
2024–2025	United States U20	12	(7)
2023–2024	United States U23	7	(1)
2023–	United States	3	(0)
- * Club domestic league appearances and goals as of 04:04, November 10, 2026 (UTC) ‡ National team caps and goals as of October 9, 2025

Benjamin Cremaschi (Spanish: Benjamín [beŋxaˈmiŋ kɾeˈmaski]; born March 2, 2005) is an American professional soccer player who plays as a midfielder for Serie A club Parma and the United States national team.

Cremaschi is a product of the Inter Miami academy, and signed with their senior team in 2022. With Inter Miami, Cremaschi helped win the 2023 Leagues Cup and 2024 Supporters' Shield, before joining Serie A club Parma on loan for the 2025 season. The following season, Cremaschi joined Parma on a permanent deal.

Cremaschi has represented the United States at the U19, U20, U23, and senior level, and was selected for the 2024 Summer Olympics, and the 2023 and 2025 editions of the FIFA U-20 World Cup. Cremaschi won the Golden Ball award in the 2025 FIFA U-20 World Cup and was named the 2025 U.S. Soccer Young Male Player of the Year for his performances over the calendar year.

== Early career ==
Cremaschi began playing soccer with Key Biscayne SC at the age of 6, and at 14 moved to Weston FC. He helped the Weston Academy win the 2021 U16 MLS Next Cup, where he won the Golden Ball.

== Club career ==
=== Inter Miami ===
In 2021, Cremaschi joined Inter Miami's academy. In 2022, he helped the Inter Miami U17s win the Generation Adidas Cup and earned a MLS Next All-Star selection. In 2022, Cremaschi also made his debut with Inter Miami II, scoring 5 and assisting one in the 2022 MLS Next Pro season.

On November 22, 2022, he signed his first professional contract with the senior Inter Miami side. He made his professional debut with Inter Miami on February 25, 2023 as a late substitute in a 2–0 Major League Soccer win over CF Montréal. In 2023, Inter Miami won the 2023 Leagues Cup, where Cremaschi played a part with 2 assists and 1 goal.

On August 16, 2025, Cremaschi expressed dissatisfaction with his playing time and being put into positions he is less comfortable with by coach Javier Mascherano, saying in a pre-match interview "I go to the games and I have no idea where I'm going to play". Mascherano publicly responded to Cremaschi's statements, stating that he hadn't heard any personal complaints from Cremaschi, he was open to Cremaschi privately confiding in him, and that players sometimes had to play in positions that they may not like in order to get playing time.

=== Parma ===
On September 2, 2025, Cremaschi was loaned to Serie A club Parma through June 2026 with an option to buy. Cremaschi would make his debut for the club getting subbed into a 2–1 loss against Roma on October 29.

On June 27, 2026, Inter Miami announced that it had permanently transferred Cremaschi to Parma after Parma exercised its purchase option.

== International career ==
Born in the United States to Argentine parents, Cremaschi is eligible to represent both countries. He also holds Italian citizenship. He was called up to the United States under-19s for their winning campaign at the Slovenia Nations Cup in September 2022. In October of the same year, he was called up to a training camp for the United States under-20s to prepare for the 2023 FIFA U-20 World Cup. On December 7, 2022, he was called up to the Argentina under-20s for a training camp in anticipation of the 2023 South American U-20 Championship but did not make the final roster. Then head coach Javier Mascherano pushed him toward the U.S. pathway.

On August 30, 2023, Cremaschi was called up to the U.S. senior national team for the September window. He made his debut for the senior team on September 13, coming in as a substitute in the 71st minute in a friendly match against Oman.

On October 8, 2023, Cremaschi was called up to the United States under-23 team ahead of friendlies against Mexico and Japan.

On July 8, 2024, Cremaschi was selected as the youngest member of the United States men's Olympic soccer team for the 2024 Summer Olympics in Paris, where the group stage opponents will include France, New Zealand, and Guinea on July 24, 27, and 30th, respectively. Since 1992, the Olympic men's soccer competition is contested not by the senior national teams, but rather by the U23 teams, of which the 18 members must include at least 15 players under age 23 as of January 1 of the Olympic year. At most, three overage players can be added to each country's under-23 Olympic squad. As the only member of the 2024 US Olympic selection who was born in 2005, Cremaschi was the sole player who will remain under-23 age-eligible for the 2028 Summer Olympics to be held in Los Angeles.

In the 2025 FIFA U-20 World Cup, Cremaschi scored a hat-trick against New Caledonia in a 9–1 win on September 29, 2025, contributing to the United States U20's largest margin of victory on record in the tournament. Cremaschi finished joint top-scorer in the tournament and was awarded the adidas Golden Boot. On January 15, 2026, Cremaschi was announced as the winner of the 2025 U.S. Soccer Young Male Player of the Year.

== Personal life ==
Benjamin is the son of the Argentine former rugby international Pablo Cremaschi.

During the 2025 FIFA U-20 World Cup, it was stated that Benjamin is the grandson of the former Chile international footballer Atilio Cremaschi. Despite the fact that he is not of Chilean descent, Benjamin and Atilio share common ancestors, an Italian family who came to South America around the year 1900, according to Atilio Cremaschi Jr.

== Career statistics ==
=== Club ===
As of match played November 7, 2026

Appearances and goals by club, season and competition
Club	Season	League			National cup (Note: Includes U.S. Open Cup, Coppa Italia)		Continental		Other		Total	
Club	Season	Division	Apps	Goals	Apps	Goals	Apps	Goals	Apps	Goals	Apps	Goals
Inter Miami II	2022	MLS Next Pro	13	5	—		—		—		13	5
Inter Miami II	2023	MLS Next Pro	4	0	—		—		—		4	0
Inter Miami II	2024	MLS Next Pro	2	0	—		—		—		2	0
Inter Miami II	Total		19	5	—		—		—		19	5
Inter Miami	2023	Major League Soccer	28	2	6	0	—		7 (Note: Appearances in Leagues Cup)	1	41	3
Inter Miami	2024	Major League Soccer	22	4	—		—		5 (Note: Two appearances in Leagues Cup, three appearances in MLS Cup playoffs)	0	27	4
Inter Miami	2025	Major League Soccer	22	1	—		8 (Note: Appearances in CONCACAF Champions Cup)	0	9 (Note: Four appearances in FIFA Club World Cup, five appearances in Leagues Cup)	0	33	1
Inter Miami	Total		72	7	6	0	8	0	21	1	107	8
Parma (loan)	2025–26	Serie A	8	0	1	0	—		—		9	0
Parma	2026–27	Serie A	3	0	0	0	—		—		3	0
Parma	Total		11	0	1	0	0	0	0	0	12	0
Career total			102	12	7	0	8	0	21	1	138	13

=== International ===
As of match played January 22, 2025

Appearances and goals by national team and year
National team	Year	Apps	Goals
United States	2023	1	0
United States	2024	0	0
United States	2025	2	0
Total		3	0

== Honors ==
Inter Miami

- Leagues Cup: 2023
- Supporters' Shield: 2024

Individual

- FIFA U-20 World Cup Golden Boot: 2025
- U.S. Soccer Young Male Player of the Year: 2025
