= Santiago Morales (soccer) =

American soccer player (born 2007)

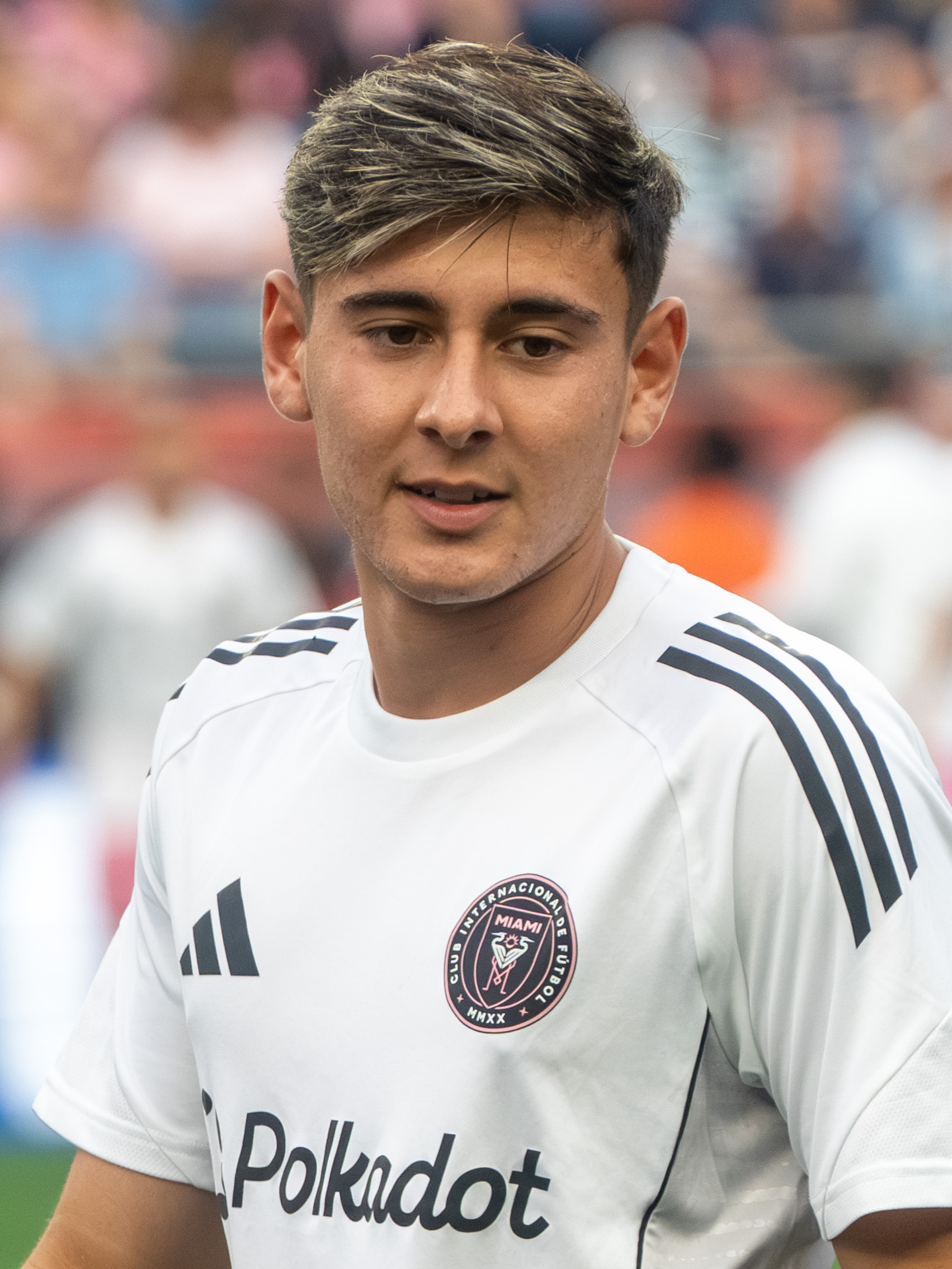
- Morales with Inter Miami in 2025

Personal information
- Full name: Santiago Morales
- Date of birth: February 9, 2007 (age 19)
- Place of birth: Santa Cruz de Tenerife, Spain
- Height: 5 ft 7 in (1.70 m)
- Position: Midfielder

Team information
- Current team: Inter Miami
- Number: 20

Youth career
- FC Dallas
- –2023: Inter Miami

Senior career*
Years	Team	Apps	(Gls)
2023–	Inter Miami II	42	(6)
2025–	Inter Miami	4	(0)

International career^{‡}
2022	United States U15	1	(0)
2022–2023	United States U16	6	(2)
2023	United States U17	3	(0)
2024–2025	United States U18	2	(0)
2026–	United States U20	1	(1)
- * Club domestic league appearances and goals as of January 1, 2026 ‡ National team caps and goals as of July 27, 2026

Santiago Morales (born February 9, 2007) is a professional soccer player who plays as a midfielder for Inter Miami. Born in Spain, he is a United States youth international.

== Early life ==
Morales was born on February 9, 2007 in Santa Cruz de Tenerife, Spain. The son of Argentine footballer Javier Morales, he has a younger brother. Growing up, he regarded Spain international Andrés Iniesta and Argentina international Lionel Messi as his football idols.

== Club career ==
As a youth player, Morales joined the youth academy of American side FC Dallas. Subsequently, he joined the youth academy of American side Inter Miami, helping the club's under-15 team win the 2022 MLS Next Cup before being promoted to the reserve team in 2023. On 12 June 2023, he debuted for them during a 1-1 home loss on penalties to Toronto FC II in the league.

== International career ==
Morales is eligible to represent Argentina, Spain, and the United States. He was named to the United States under-20 squad for the 2026 CONCACAF U-20 Championship.

== Honors ==
Inter Miami

- MLS Cup: 2025
- Campeones Cup: 2026
