= 2026 Inter Miami CF season =

Inter Miami CF
2026 season
- President: David Beckham
- Head coach: Javier Mascherano (until April 14); Guillermo Hoyos (interim, from April 14 until September 14); Kily González (from September 15)
- Stadium: Chase Stadium (until March 18); Nu Stadium (from April 4)
- Major League Soccer: Conference: 2nd Overall: 3rd
- MLS Cup playoffs: Round one
- CONCACAF Champions Cup: Round of 16
- Leagues Cup: League phase
- Campeones Cup: Winners
- Top goalscorer: League: Lionel Messi (26); All: Lionel Messi (30)
- Biggest win: 7–1 vs. CF Montréal (August 29)
- Biggest defeat: 0–3 vs. Los Angeles FC (February 21); 1–4 vs. Nashville SC (August 15); 0–3 vs. Columbus Crew (November 21)
Home colors	Away colors	Third colors

The 2026 season is the seventh season for Inter Miami CF, a professional soccer team based in Miami, Florida, United States. The team plays in Major League Soccer (MLS), the top flight of club soccer in the United States, as a member of the Eastern Conference. This is the first season for the team at Nu Stadium. The year also marks the 23rd season of first-division club soccer in South Florida. In addition to playing in the MLS regular season, Inter Miami CF competed in the CONCACAF Champions Cup for the third time, as well as the Leagues Cup and the Campeones Cup.

Inter Miami CF enters the season as the defending MLS Cup champions; in MLS Cup 2025, they defeated Vancouver Whitecaps FC.

== Summary ==
=== Preseason ===
After a six-week offseason, Inter Miami CF began their preseason training camp on January 17 in Fort Lauderdale ahead of three friendlies on a tour of South America. An additional match, against Independiente del Valle of Ecuador, was scheduled for February 13 in Bayamón, Puerto Rico. It was postponed to February 26—a week into the MLS regular season—after the club announced that Lionel Messi had a muscle strain and would be unable to play. During the rescheduled friendly, Messi was tackled to the ground by a security guard during an attempt to restrain a pitch invader.

== Non-competitive results ==
=== Preseason ===
The full preseason schedule with matches in South America was announced on January 23, 2026.

January 24 1	Alianza Lima (Peru)	3–0	(United States) Inter Miami CF	Lima, Peru
5:00 p.m. EST	Guerrero 29', 36'; Ramos 72'	Report	Hot (yellow card) 82'	Stadium: Estadio Alejandro Villanueva; Attendance: 30,000; Referee: Kevin Ortega (Peru)

January 31 2	Atlético Nacional (Colombia)	1–2	(United States) Inter Miami CF	Medellín, Colombia
5:00 p.m. EST	Rengifo 26'; Morelos (yellow card) 90'	Report	Suárez 55'; De Paul (yellow card) 60'; Rivero 90+1' (o.g.)	Stadium: Estadio Atanasio Girardot; Attendance: 38,026; Referee: María Daza (Colombia)

February 7 3	Barcelona SC (Ecuador)	2–2	(United States) Inter Miami CF	Guayaquil, Ecuador
7:00 p.m. EST	Rojas 41'; Martínez 87'	Report	Fray (yellow card) 21'; Messi 31'; Berterame 45+3'; Ayala (red card) 87'; Jiana (yellow card) 90+2'	Stadium: Estadio Monumental Banco Pichincha; Referee: Yerson Zambrano (Ecuador)

=== Friendlies ===
February 26 Friendly	Inter Miami CF (United States)	2–1	(Ecuador) Independiente del Valle	Bayamón, Puerto Rico
8:00 p.m. EST	Bright (yellow card) 15'; Morales 16'; Messi 70' (pen.)	Report	Mercado 17'; Perelló (yellow card) 37'	Stadium: Juan Ramón Loubriel Stadium; Attendance: 12,500; Referee: José Torres (Puerto Rico)
Note: The match was originally scheduled for February 13.

== Competitions ==
=== Overview ===
Competition	First match	Last match	Starting round	Final position	Record							
Competition	First match	Last match	Starting round	Final position	Pld	W	D	L	GF	GA	GD	Win %
Major League Soccer	February 21	November 7	Matchday 1	3rd	34	16	12	6	80	59	+21	47.06
MLS Cup playoffs	November 21	TBD	Round one	TBD	1	0	0	1	0	3	−3	0.00
CONCACAF Champions Cup	March 11	March 18	Round of 16	Round of 16	2	0	2	0	1	1	+0	0.00
Leagues Cup	August 5	August 12	League phase	League phase	3	1	0	2	7	7	+0	33.33
Campeones Cup	September 16		Final	Winners	1	1	0	0	2	0	+2	100.00
Total					41	18	14	9	90	70	+20	43.90

Last updated: November 22, 2026
Source: ESPN

=== Major League Soccer (MLS) ===
==== League tables ====
MLS Eastern Conference table (2026)
Pos	Team	Pld	W	L	T	GF	GA	GD	Pts	Qualification
1	Nashville SC	34	23	3	8	71	25	+46	77	Qualification for round one and the CONCACAF Champions Cup round one
2	Inter Miami CF	34	16	6	12	80	59	+21	60	Qualification for round one
3	New England Revolution	34	18	12	4	55	47	+8	58	Qualification for round one
4	Chicago Fire FC	34	16	11	7	64	54	+10	55	Qualification for round one
5	Charlotte FC	34	15	10	9	66	51	+15	54	Qualification for round one

Source: MLS
Rules for classification: 1) points; 2) total wins; 3) total goal differential; 4) total goals scored; 5) fewer disciplinary points; 6) away goal differential; 7) away goals scored; 8) home goals differential; 9) home goals scored; 10) coin toss (2 clubs tied) or drawing of lots (≥3 clubs tied)

Overall MLS standings table
Pos	Team	Pld	W	L	T	GF	GA	GD	Pts	Qualification
1	Nashville SC (S)	34	23	3	8	71	25	+46	77	Qualification for the CONCACAF Champions Cup round one (Note: As 2026 MLS Supporters' Shield champions)
2	Vancouver Whitecaps FC	34	19	8	7	74	34	+40	64	Qualification for the CONCACAF Champions Cup round one (Note: As Western Conference regular season winners)
3	Inter Miami CF	34	16	6	12	80	59	+21	60	Qualification for the CONCACAF Champions Cup round one (Note: As one of the next two highest-ranked clubs in 2026 MLS Supporters' Shield not already qualified)
4	New England Revolution	34	18	12	4	55	47	+8	58	Qualification for the CONCACAF Champions Cup round one
5	FC Dallas	34	16	8	10	62	51	+11	58	

Source: MLS
Rules for classification: 1) points; 2) total wins; 3) total goal differential; 4) total goals scored; 5) fewer disciplinary points; 6) away goal differential; 7) away goals scored; 8) home goals differential; 9) home goals scored; 10) coin toss (2 clubs tied) or drawing of lots (≥3 clubs tied)
(S) Supporters' Shield winners

==== Results summary ====
Overall								Home						Away					
Pld	W	D	L	GF	GA	GD	Pts	W	D	L	GF	GA	GD	W	D	L	GF	GA	GD
34	16	12	6	80	59	+21	60	6	9	2	46	31	+15	10	3	4	34	28	+6

Source: MLS standings

==== Results by round ====
Round	1	2	3	4	5	6	7	8	9	10	11	12	13	14	15	16	17	18	19	20	21	22	23	24	25	26	27	28	29	30	31	32	33	34
Stadium	A	A	A	A	A	H	H	A	A	H	H	A	A	H	H	H	A	H	A	A	H	H	H	A	H	H	A	H	H	A	A	H	A	H
Result	L	W	W	D	W	D	D	W	W	D	L	W	W	W	W	W	W	D	L	D	L	W	D	D	D	D	L	W	W	W	L	D	W	D
Position (East)	14	7	3	3	3	4	3	2	2	2	3	3	2	2	2	2	2	2	2	2	2	2	2	2	2	3	3	2	2	2	3	3	2	2
Points	0	3	6	7	10	11	12	15	18	19	19	22	25	28	31	34	37	38	38	39	39	42	43	44	45	46	46	49	52	55	55	56	59	60

Source: MLS standings
A = Away; H = Home; N = Neutral; W = Win; D = Draw; L = Loss; P = Postponed

==== Regular season results ====
The MLS regular season schedule was released on November 20, 2025. Inter Miami CF played 34 matches—17 at home and 17 away—primarily against the 14 other teams in the Eastern Conference; the team also played six opponents from the Western Conference.

Win Draw Loss Void Postponed

February 21 1	Los Angeles FC	3–0	Inter Miami CF	Los Angeles, California
9:30 p.m. EST	Martínez 38'; Bouanga 73', (yellow card) 80'; Ordaz 90+4'	Report	Falcón (yellow card) 45+3'; Segovia (yellow card) 80'	Stadium: Los Angeles Memorial Coliseum; Attendance: 75,673; Referee: Pierre-Luc Lauzière

March 1 2	Orlando City SC	2–4	Inter Miami CF	Orlando, Florida
7:00 p.m. EST	Pašalić 18', (yellow card) 74'; M. Ojeda 24'; Guske (yellow card) 45' (yellow-red card) 88'; Miller (yellow card) 45+4'; Dorsey (yellow card) 71'	Report	Allende (yellow card) 45+4'; Silvetti 49'; Messi 57', 90'; Segovia 85', (yellow card) 90+4'; De Paul (yellow card) 90+8'	Stadium: Inter&Co Stadium; Attendance: 24,453; Referee: Ismail Elfath

March 7 3	D.C. United	1–2	Inter Miami CF	Baltimore, Maryland
4:30 p.m. EST	Peglow (yellow card) 58'; Baribo 75'	Report	De Paul 17'; Messi 27'; St. Clair (yellow card) 87'	Stadium: M&T Bank Stadium; Attendance: 72,026; Referee: Filip Dujic

March 14 4	Charlotte FC	0–0	Inter Miami CF	Charlotte, North Carolina
7:30 p.m. EDT	Zaha (yellow card) 32'; Westwood (yellow card) 38'; Toffolo (yellow card) 77'	Report	Silvetti (yellow card) 6'; Segovia (yellow card) 75'	Stadium: Bank of America Stadium; Attendance: 34,780; Referee: Guido Gonzales Jr.

March 22 5	New York City FC	2–3	Inter Miami CF	New York City, New York
1:00 p.m. EDT	Fernández 17'; Ojeda 59'; Moralez (yellow card) 61'	Report	Luján 4', (yellow card) 38'; Micael (yellow card) 53', (goal) 74'; Allende (yellow card) 55'; Messi 61'	Stadium: Yankee Stadium; Attendance: 45,845; Referee: Armando Villarreal

April 4 6	Inter Miami CF	2–2	Austin FC	Miami, Florida
7:30 p.m. EDT	Messi 10'; Falcón (yellow card) 43'; Bright (yellow card) 60'; Suárez 82'	Report	Biro 6'; Nelson 53'	Stadium: Nu Stadium; Attendance: 26,412; Referee: Allen Chapman

April 11 7	Inter Miami CF	2–2	New York Red Bulls	Miami, Florida
7:30 p.m. EDT	Silvetti 45+2'; Berterame 55'; Fray (yellow card) 76'	Report	Ruvalcaba 15'; Cowell (yellow card) 59'; Mehmeti 77'; Mosquera (yellow card) 80'	Stadium: Nu Stadium; Attendance: 26,277; Referee: Rosendo Mendoza

April 18 8	Colorado Rapids	2–3	Inter Miami CF	Denver, Colorado
4:30 p.m. EDT	Atencio (yellow card) 18'; R. Navarro 58'; Yapi 62'; Frederick (yellow card) 64'; Herrington (yellow card) 76'; Travis (yellow card) 90+4'	Report	Messi 18' (pen.), 79', (yellow card) 90+3'; De Paul (yellow card) 22'; Micael (yellow card) 29'; Berterame 45+5'; Segovia (yellow card) 86'; Bright (red card) 87'	Stadium: Empower Field at Mile High; Attendance: 75,824; Referee: Jon Freemon

April 22 9	Real Salt Lake	0–2	Inter Miami CF	Sandy, Utah
9:30 p.m. EDT	Yedlin (yellow card) 43'; Spierings (yellow card) 45+4'; Luna (yellow card) 58'	Report	Allen (yellow card) 42'; Micael (yellow card) 58'; Segovia (yellow card) 65'; De Paul 82'; Suárez 83'	Stadium: America First Field; Attendance: 21,512; Referee: Pierre-Luc Lauzière

April 25 10	Inter Miami CF	1–1	New England Revolution	Miami, Florida
7:30 p.m. EDT	Allende (yellow card) 59'; Ruiz (yellow card) 67'; Berterame 76'; Micael (yellow card) 90+2'	Report	Gil 56'	Stadium: Nu Stadium; Attendance: 26,609; Referee: Rubiel Vazquez

May 2 11	Inter Miami CF	3–4	Orlando City SC	Miami, Florida
7:00 p.m. EDT	Fray 4'; Segovia 25'; Messi 33', (yellow card) 78'; Falcón (yellow card) 45+4'; St. Clair (yellow card) 45+5'; Bright (yellow card) 52'; De Paul (yellow card) 59'	Report	Jansson (yellow card) 18'; Marín (yellow card) 36'; M. Ojeda 39', 68', 79' (pen.); Spicer 90+3'; Crépeau (yellow card) 90+6'	Stadium: Nu Stadium; Attendance: 26,684; Referee: Guido Gonzales Jr.

May 9 12	Toronto FC	2–4	Inter Miami CF	Toronto, Ontario
1:00 p.m. EDT	Edwards (yellow card) 51'; Aristizábal 82', 90'	Report	De Paul 44'; Suárez 56', (yellow card) 61'; Reguilón 73'; Messi 75'; Pintér (yellow card) 89'	Stadium: BMO Field; Attendance: 44,828; Referee: Victor Rivas

May 13 13	FC Cincinnati	3–5	Inter Miami CF	Cincinnati, Ohio
7:30 p.m. EDT	Denkey 41' (pen.); Bucha 49'; Evander 64', (yellow card) 90+4'; Nwobodo (yellow card) 76'	Report	Messi 24', 55'; Fray (yellow card) 38'; Luján (yellow card) 40'; Bright (yellow card) 77'; Silvetti 79'; Berterame 84'; Celentano 89' (o.g.)	Stadium: TQL Stadium; Attendance: 25,513; Referee: Alexis Da Silva

May 17 14	Inter Miami CF	2–0	Portland Timbers	Miami, Florida
6:00 p.m. EDT	Messi 31'; De Paul (yellow card) 41'; Berterame 42'; Segovia (yellow card) 58'	Report	Da Costa (yellow card) 65'; Surman (yellow card) 90+2'	Stadium: Nu Stadium; Attendance: 26,715; Referee: Drew Fischer

May 24 15	Inter Miami CF	6–4	Philadelphia Union	Miami, Florida
7:00 p.m. EDT	St. Clair (yellow card) 9'; Berterame 13', 42'; Suárez 29', 44', 81'; Fray (yellow card) 38'; Segovia (yellow card) 45+11'; Reguilón (yellow card) 49'; Luján (yellow card) 90+3'; De Paul 90+3'; Allen (yellow card) 90+7'	Report	Iloski 4', 10' (pen.), 45+8' (pen.); Martínez (yellow card) 16'; Damiani 20'; Lukić (yellow card) 24'; Jean Jacques (yellow card) 75'	Stadium: Nu Stadium; Attendance: 26,649; Referee: Rosendo Mendoza

July 22 16	Inter Miami CF	3–2	Chicago Fire FC	Miami, Florida
7:30 p.m. EDT	Suárez 27' (pen.), 51'; Plambeck 87'; Reguilón (yellow card) 90+7'	Report	Ríos Novo 18'; Elliott (yellow card) 64'; Dithejane 67'	Stadium: Nu Stadium; Attendance: 25,123; Referee: Rubiel Vazquez

July 25 17	CF Montréal	0–1	Inter Miami CF	Montreal, Quebec
7:30 p.m. EDT		Report	Fray (yellow card) 23'; Suárez 81' (pen.); Segovia (yellow card) 84'	Stadium: Saputo Stadium; Attendance: 19,619; Referee: Alexis Da Silva

August 1 18	Inter Miami CF	2–2	Columbus Crew	Miami, Florida
7:30 p.m. EDT	Suárez 16'; Allen 45+5'; Casemiro (yellow card) 82'	Report	Casemiro 34' (o.g.); Bangoura (yellow card) 74'; Méndez 84'; Schulte (yellow card) 90+5'	Stadium: Nu Stadium; Attendance: 25,922; Referee: Tori Penso

August 15 19	Nashville SC	4–1	Inter Miami CF	Nashville, Tennessee
8:30 p.m. EDT	Nájar 17'; Surridge (yellow card) 45+6', (goal) 56'; Mukhtar 49', 63'	Report	Segovia 45+3'; Casemiro (yellow card) 48'; Messi (yellow card) 59'; Ruiz (yellow card) 79'	Stadium: Geodis Park; Attendance: 30,109; Referee: Drew Fischer

August 19 20	Philadelphia Union	2–2	Inter Miami CF	Chester, Pennsylvania
7:30 p.m. EDT	Vassilev 11'; Wagner (yellow card) 43'; Pierre 58'; Iloski (yellow card) 87'; Alladoh (yellow card) 90+5'; C. Sullivan (red card) 90+12'; Q. Sullivan (yellow card) 90+13'	Report	Pintér 21'; Messi 26'; Reguilón (yellow card) 50'; Fray (yellow card) 55'; Bright (red card) 90+12'	Stadium: Subaru Park; Attendance: 19,778; Referee: Filip Dujic

August 22 21	Inter Miami CF	1–2	Toronto FC	Miami, Florida
7:30 p.m. EDT	Falcón (yellow card) 53'; Messi 82'; Ayala (yellow card) 90+5'	Report	Laryea (yellow card) 37'; Sargent 59'; Etienne 62'	Stadium: Nu Stadium; Attendance: 26,654; Referee: Ismail Elfath

August 29 22	Inter Miami CF	7–1	CF Montréal	Miami, Florida
7:30 p.m. EDT	Fray (yellow card) 11'; Casemiro 20'; Messi 40', 52', 83', 90+6'; Suárez 80'; Shaw 89'	Report	Herbers (yellow card) 35', (goal) 37'; Streit (yellow card) 39'	Stadium: Nu Stadium; Attendance: 26,066; Referee: Elijio Arreguin

September 5 23	Inter Miami CF	2–2	Atlanta United FC	Miami, Florida
7:30 p.m. EDT	Falcón (yellow card) 28'; Casemiro 32', (yellow card) 72'; Berterame (yellow card) 42'; Suárez 45+1'; Caicedo (yellow card) 58'; St. Clair (yellow card) 62'; De Paul (yellow card) 75'	Report	Almirón 35', (penalty missed) 73'; Sanchez (yellow card) 39'; Díaz (yellow card) 47'; Embolo 87' (pen.); Edwards (yellow card) 90+5'	Stadium: Nu Stadium; Attendance: 26,635; Referee: Jon Freemon

September 9 24	Chicago Fire FC	1–1	Inter Miami CF	Chicago, Illinois
8:30 p.m. EDT	Lewandowski 10'; Dean (yellow card) 50'; D'Avilla (yellow card) 59'	Report	Segovia (yellow card) 4'; Falcón (yellow card) 24'; Casemiro 48'; Berterame (yellow card) 71'	Stadium: Soldier Field; Attendance: 63,094; Referee: Jair Marrufo

September 12 25	Inter Miami CF	2–2	Nashville SC	Miami, Florida
7:30 p.m. EDT	Baker-Whiting 19' (o.g.); Caicedo (yellow card) 41'; Messi 62'; Berterame (yellow card) 86'; Galarza (yellow card) 90'	Report	Surridge 4', 90+1'; Muyl (yellow card) 9'; Woledzi (yellow card) 43'	Stadium: Nu Stadium; Attendance: 26,603; Referee: Guido Gonzales Jr.

September 20 26	Inter Miami CF	2–2	San Diego FC	Miami, Florida
7:00 p.m. EDT	Messi 24'; Bright (yellow card) 64'; Suárez 74'; Shaw (yellow card) 82'	Report	Dreyer 12', 82'; Murphy (yellow card) 33'	Stadium: Nu Stadium; Attendance: 25,743; Referee: Rosendo Mendoza

September 27 27	Columbus Crew	2–1	Inter Miami CF	Columbus, Ohio
7:00 p.m. EDT	Martínez 28' (pen.); Chambost (yellow card) 38'; Méndez (yellow card) 75'; Bailly (yellow card) 78'; Bangoura (yellow card) 83'; Thiaré 90+8'	Report	Casemiro (yellow card) 27'; Messi 33'; Micael (yellow card) 67'; Pintér (yellow card) 80'; Luján (yellow card) 90+2'; Morales (yellow card) 90+4' (yellow-red card) 90+6'; Barraza (yellow card) 90+10'	Stadium: ScottsMiracle-Gro Field; Attendance: 21,188; Referee: Victor Rivas

October 10 28	Inter Miami CF	4–0	D.C. United	Miami, Florida
7:30 p.m. EDT	Suárez 3', 39'; Messi 47', 60'	Report		Stadium: Nu Stadium; Attendance: 26,679; Referee: Lukasz Szpala

October 14 29	Inter Miami CF	2–0	New York City FC	Miami, Florida
7:30 p.m. EDT	Berterame 20'; De Paul 45+5'; Galarza (yellow card) 52'; Riquelme (yellow card) 85'	Report	Fernández (penalty missed) 90+7'	Stadium: Nu Stadium; Attendance: 25,773; Referee: Lorenzo Hernandez

October 17 30	Atlanta United FC	1–3	Inter Miami CF	Atlanta, Georgia
7:30 p.m. EDT	Jacob (yellow card) 44'; Amaro (yellow card) 54'; Embolo (yellow card) 71'; Picault 89' (pen.)	Report	Berterame 45'; Messi 56', 60', (yellow card) 90+6'; Falcón (yellow card) 89'	Stadium: Mercedes-Benz Stadium; Attendance: 46,686; Referee: Allen Chapman

October 24 31	New York Red Bulls	2–0	Inter Miami CF	Harrison, New Jersey
4:30 p.m. EDT	Casemiro 7' (o.g.); Bazán (yellow card) 80'; Forsberg 90+1'	Report	Morales (yellow card) 90+4'	Stadium: Sports Illustrated Stadium; Attendance: 26,287; Referee: Filip Dujic

October 28 32	Inter Miami CF	2–2	FC Cincinnati	Miami, Florida
7:30 p.m. EDT	Messi (yellow card) 44'; Suárez 61', (yellow card) 90+4'; Riquelme 90'; Segovia (yellow card) 90+2'	Report	Mboma Dem 80'; Gidi 86'	Stadium: Nu Stadium; Attendance: 26,752; Referee: Armando Villarreal

November 1 33	New England Revolution	1–2	Inter Miami CF	Foxborough, Massachusetts
6:00 p.m. EST	Gazdag 53'; Langoni (yellow card) 90+6'	Report	Luján (yellow card) 25'; Berterame 69'; Galarza (yellow card) 75'; Messi 83'; Segovia (yellow card) 85'	Stadium: Gillette Stadium; Attendance: 54,112; Referee: Serhiy Boyko

November 7 34	Inter Miami CF	3–3	Charlotte FC	Miami, Florida
4:00 p.m. EST	Segovia (yellow card) 9'; Fray 14'; Suárez 33'; De Paul 42'	Report	Abada 50', 55'; Schnegg (yellow card) 88'; Aloko 90'	Stadium: Nu Stadium; Attendance: 26,854; Referee: Rubiel Vazquez

=== MLS Cup playoffs ===
November 21 Round one match 1	Inter Miami CF	0–3	Columbus Crew	Miami, Florida
6:00 p.m. EST	Luján (yellow card) 13' (yellow-red card) 36'; Messi (yellow card) 45+4'; Bright (yellow card) 45+5'; Fray (yellow card) 66'	Report	Tapia 9' (pen.), 58', (yellow card) 45+4'; Chambost (yellow card) 43'; Habroune 52'; Martínez (yellow card) 81'	Stadium: Nu Stadium; Referee: Allen Chapman

November 27 Round one match 2	Columbus Crew	v	Inter Miami CF	Columbus, Ohio
8:00 p.m. EST				Stadium: ScottsMiracle-Gro Field

December 2 Round one match 3 (if necessary)	Inter Miami CF	v	Columbus Crew	Miami, Florida
p.m. EST				Stadium: Nu Stadium

=== CONCACAF Champions Cup ===
Inter Miami CF qualified for the tournament as the winner of MLS Cup 2025, and were granted a bye to the round of 16.

==== Round of 16 ====
March 11 First leg	Nashville SC (United States)	0–0	(United States) Inter Miami CF	Nashville, Tennessee
7:30 p.m. EDT		Report	Berterame (yellow card) 51'	Stadium: Geodis Park; Attendance: 25,616; Referee: Juan Gabriel Calderón (Costa Rica)

March 18 Second leg	Inter Miami CF (United States)	1–1 (1–1 (a) agg.)	(United States) Nashville SC	Fort Lauderdale, Florida
7:00 p.m. EDT	Messi 7'; Luján (yellow card) 38'	Report	Espinoza 74'	Stadium: Chase Stadium; Attendance: 17,263; Referee: Adonai Escobedo (Mexico)

=== Leagues Cup ===
==== League phase ====
Pos	Team	Pld	W	PW	PL	L	GF	GA	GD	Pts
12	Minnesota United FC	3	1	0	1	1	4	3	+1	4
13	Nashville SC	3	1	0	0	2	5	4	+1	3
14	Inter Miami CF	3	1	0	0	2	7	7	0	3
15	New York City FC	3	1	0	0	2	4	4	0	3
16	Seattle Sounders FC	3	1	0	0	2	4	5	−1	3

Source: Leagues Cup

August 5 1	Inter Miami CF (United States)	4–2	(Mexico) Atlético San Luis	Miami, Florida
7:30 p.m. EDT	Messi 11', 44'; Segovia 26'; Fray (yellow card) 45+3'; Micael 45+7'	Report	Rodríguez 4'; Llorente 51'	Stadium: Nu Stadium; Attendance: 23,999; Referee: Saíd Martínez (Honduras)

August 8 2	Inter Miami CF (United States)	1–2	(Mexico) Monterrey	Miami, Florida
8:00 p.m. EDT	De Paul 32', (yellow card) 33'; Micael (yellow card) 38'; Casemiro (yellow card) 81'; Ruiz (yellow card) 86'	Report	Cuypers 47'; Arteaga (yellow card) 86'; Rossi 90'; Ocampos (yellow card) 90+6'	Stadium: Nu Stadium; Attendance: 26,543; Referee: Bryan López (Guatemala)

August 12 3	Inter Miami CF (United States)	2–3	(Mexico) León	Miami, Florida
7:30 p.m. EDT	Segovia (yellow card) 33'; Pintér 42'; Bright 54'; Casemiro (yellow card) 55'; Plambeck (yellow card) 79'	Report	Arcila 50', 83', (yellow card) 64'; Romaña (yellow card) 55'; Domínguez 61'	Stadium: Nu Stadium; Attendance: 21,318; Referee: Mario Escobar (Guatemala)

=== Campeones Cup ===
September 16 Final	Inter Miami CF (United States)	2–0	(Mexico) Cruz Azul	Miami, Florida
8:00 p.m. EDT	Messi 24'; Galarza (yellow card) 41'; Casemiro 81'; Shaw (yellow card) 90'	Report	Ditta (yellow card) 66'; Fernández (yellow card) 73'	Stadium: Nu Stadium; Attendance: 26,495; Referee: Keylor Herrera (Costa Rica)

== Roster ==
As of September 21, 2026

No.	Player	Nationality	Pos.	Age	Signed from	Contract ends	Notes
Goalkeepers
13	Luis Barraza	United States	GK	30	(United States) D.C. United	Jun 2027	
34	Rocco Ríos Novo	Argentina	GK	24	(Argentina) Lanús	Jun 2029	
97	Dayne St. Clair	Canada	GK	29	(United States) Minnesota United FC	Dec 2026	
Defenders
2	Gonzalo Luján	Argentina	DF	25	(Argentina) San Lorenzo	Dec 2027	
3	Sergio Reguilón	Spain	DF	29	Free agent	Dec 2027	International
4	Facundo Mura	Argentina	DF	27	(Argentina) Racing Club	Jun 2029	
15	Fricio Caicedo	Ecuador	DF	18	(Costa Rica) Moravia FCM	Jun 2027	International, on loan
16	Micael	Brazil	DF	26	(Brazil) Palmeiras	Dec 2026	International, on loan
17	Ian Fray	Jamaica	DF	24	(United States) Fort Lauderdale CF	Jun 2029	
26	Tyler Hall	United States	DF	20	(United States) Inter Miami CF II	Dec 2027	HGP
37	Maximiliano Falcón	Uruguay	DF	29	(Chile) Colo-Colo	Dec 2028	International
62	Israel Boatwright	Dominican Republic	DF	21	(United States) Inter Miami CF II	Dec 2026	HGP
70	Daniel Sumalla	United States	DF	19	(United States) Inter Miami CF II	Dec 2026	HGP
76	Cesar Abadia-Reda	United States	DF	20	(United States) Inter Miami CF II	Dec 2026	HGP
Midfielders
5	Casemiro	Brazil	MF	34	(England) Manchester United	Jun 2027	International
7	Rodrigo De Paul	Argentina	MF	32	(Spain) Atlético Madrid	Dec 2029	DP; International
8	Telasco Segovia	Venezuela	MF	23	(Portugal) Casa Pia	Dec 2029	
20	Santiago Morales	United States	MF	19	(United States) Inter Miami CF II	Dec 2027	HGP
22	David Ayala	Argentina	MF	24	(United States) Portland Timbers	Dec 2026	
42	Yannick Bright	Italy	MF	25	(United States) New Hampshire Wildcats	Dec 2028	International
59	Preston Plambeck	United States	MF	20	(United States) Inter Miami CF II	Dec 2026	
80	Matías Galarza	Paraguay	MF	24	(Argentina) River Plate	Dec 2026	International, on loan
88	Alexander Shaw	United States	MF	18	(United States) Inter Miami CF II	Dec 2026	HGP
Forwards
9	Luis Suárez	Uruguay	FW	39	(Brazil) Grêmio	Dec 2026	International
10	Lionel Messi (captain)	Argentina	FW	39	(France) Paris Saint-Germain	Dec 2028	DP; International
11	Riquelme Fillipi	Brazil	FW	20	(Brazil) Palmeiras	Jun 2030	International
19	Germán Berterame	Mexico	FW	28	(Mexico) Monterrey	Jun 2029	DP; International
21	Tadeo Allende	Argentina	FW	27	(Spain) Celta Vigo	Jun 2030	International
24	Mateo Silvetti	Argentina	FW	20	(Argentina) Newell's Old Boys	Dec 2029	
54	Lovend's Delinois	Haiti	FW	22	(United States) Inter Miami CF II	Jun 2027	International
56	Dániel Pintér	United States	FW	19	(United States) Inter Miami CF II	Jun 2028	HGP

== Management ==
Position	Staff
Ownership
Managing Owner	(United States) Jorge Mas
Co-Owner	(England) David Beckham
Co-Owner	(United States) Jose Mas
Front office
President of Business Operations	(Spain) Xavier Asensi
President of Football Operations	(Spain) Raul Sanllehi
Sporting Director	(Spain) Alberto Marrero
Coaching staff
Head coach	(Argentina) Kily González
Assistant coach	(Argentina) Tomás Costa
Assistant coach	(Argentina) Ricardo de Alberto
Goalkeeper coach	(Argentina) Ignacio Don

Last updated: September 27, 2026
Source: Inter Miami CF

== Transfers ==
=== In ===
Incoming transfers for Inter Miami CF
Player	No.	Pos.	Previous team	Notes	Date
Rodrigo De Paul (ARG)	7	MF	Atlético Madrid (ESP)	Purchase option exercised after loan	December 11, 2025
Sergio Reguilón (ESP)	3	DF	Tottenham Hotspur (ENG)	Free agent	December 15, 2025
Facundo Mura (ARG)	4	DF	Racing Club (ARG)	Free agent	January 3, 2026
Dayne St. Clair (CAN)	97	GK	Minnesota United FC (USA)	Free agent	January 4, 2026
Micael (BRA)	16	DF	Palmeiras (BRA)	Loan with purchase option	January 7, 2026
David Ayala (ARG)	22	MF	Portland Timbers (USA)	Traded for up to $2.15 million	January 9, 2026
Tadeo Allende (ARG)	21	FW	Celta Vigo (ESP)	Transferred after loan	January 19, 2026
Dániel Pintér (USA)	56	FW	Inter Miami CF II (USA)	Homegrown player	January 22, 2026
Rocco Ríos Novo (ARG)	34	GK	Lanús (ARG)	Transferred after loan	January 22, 2026
Luis Barraza (USA)	13	GK	D.C. United (USA)	Free agent	January 23, 2026
Germán Berterame (MEX)	19	FW	Monterrey (MEX)	Transferred for undisclosed fee	January 31, 2026
Alexander Shaw (USA)	88	MF	Inter Miami CF II (USA)	Homegrown player	March 20, 2026
Cesar Abadia-Reda (USA)	76	DF	Inter Miami CF II (USA)	Homegrown player	April 4, 2026
Preston Plambeck (USA)	59	MF	Inter Miami CF II (USA)	Homegrown player	May 13, 2026
Fricio Caicedo (ECU)	15	DF	Moravia FCM (CRC)	Loan with purchase option	July 14, 2026
Casemiro (BRA)	5	MF	Manchester United (ENG)	Free agent	July 22, 2026
Daniel Sumalla (USA)	70	DF	Inter Miami CF II (USA)	Homegrown player	July 22, 2026
Lovend's Delinois (HAI)	54	FW	Inter Miami CF II (USA)	Promoted	August 15, 2026
Riquelme Fillipi (BRA)	11	FW	Palmeiras (BRA)	Transferred for undisclosed fee	September 2, 2026
Matías Galarza (PAR)	80	MF	River Plate (ARG)	Loan with purchase option	September 3, 2026

=== Out ===
Outgoing transfers for Inter Miami CF
Player	No.	Pos.	New team	Notes	Date
Jordi Alba (ESP)	18	DF	Retired		December 6, 2025
Sergio Busquets (ESP)	5	MF	Retired		December 6, 2025
Fafà Picault (HAI)	14	FW	Atlanta United FC (USA)	Option declined	December 11, 2025
Ryan Sailor (USA)	15	DF	Seattle Sounders FC (USA)	Out of contract	December 11, 2025
Marcelo Weigandt (ARG)	57	DF	Boca Juniors (ARG)	End of loan	December 11, 2025
William Yarbrough (USA)	25	GK	Toronto FC (CAN)	Option declined	December 11, 2025
Allen Obando (ECU)	29	FW	Barcelona SC (ECU)	End of loan	December 31, 2025
Baltasar Rodríguez (ARG)	11	MF	Racing Club (ARG)	End of loan	December 31, 2025
Tomás Avilés (ARG)	6	DF	CF Montréal (CAN)	Loan with purchase option	January 23, 2026
Oscar Ustari (ARG)	19	GK	Unattached	Contract terminated	February 2, 2026
Benjamin Cremaschi (USA)	30	MF	Parma (ITA)	Transferred after loan	June 27, 2026
Tomás Avilés (ARG)	6	DF	O'Higgins (CHI)	Loan	July 17, 2026
David Ruiz (HON)	41	MF	New York Red Bulls (USA)	Loan with purchase option	September 2, 2026
Noah Allen (GRE)	32	DF	Chicago Fire FC (USA)	Loan with purchase option	September 3, 2026

=== Draft picks ===
2026 MLS SuperDraft picks for Inter Miami
Player	Nationality	Round	Pick	Pos.	Previous team
Abdel Talabi	United States	1st	30	DF	Bryant University
Kenan Hot	United States	2nd	32	MF	Duke University
Mamadi Jiana	United States	2nd	54	FW	Bryant University
Alex Barger	United States	2nd	60	DF	Indiana University Bloomington
Maximilian Kissel	Germany	3rd	90	FW	University of Vermont

== Statistics ==
Key
MLS = Major League Soccer, PO = MLS Cup playoffs, CCC = CONCACAF Champions Cup, LC = Leagues Cup, CC = Campeones Cup
A = Appearances, S = Starts, G = Goals

As of November 22, 2026

=== Appearances and goals ===
No.	Pos	Player	Nat	MLS			PO			CCC			LC			CC			Total		
No.	Pos	Player	Nat	A	S	G	A	S	G	A	S	G	A	S	G	A	S	G	A	S	G
Goalkeepers
34	GK	Rocco Ríos Novo	(Argentina)	6	6	0	0	0	0	0	0	0	3	3	0	0	0	0	9	9	0
97	GK	Dayne St. Clair	(Canada)	28	28	0	1	1	0	2	2	0	0	0	0	1	1	0	32	32	0
Defenders
2	DF	Gonzalo Luján	(Argentina)	24	19	1	1	1	0	2	1	0	1	1	0	1	0	0	29	22	1
3	DF	Sergio Reguilón	(Spain)	20	17	1	0	0	0	1	1	0	3	0	0	1	0	0	25	'18	1
4	DF	Facundo Mura	(Argentina)	26	12	0	1	0	0	2	2	0	3	1	0	1	1	0	33	16	0
15	DF	Fricio Caicedo	(Ecuador)	6	5	0	1	0	0	–	–	–	2	1	0	1	1	0	10	7	0
16	DF	Micael	(Brazil)	25	25	1	1	1	0	2	2	0	3	3	1	1	0	0	32	31	2
17	DF	Ian Fray	(Jamaica)	27	21	2	1	1	0	1	0	0	3	3	0	0	0	0	32	25	2
37	DF	Maximiliano Falcón	(Uruguay)	19	16	0	0	0	0	1	1	0	0	0	0	1	1	0	21	18	0
76	DF	Cesar Abadía-Reda	(United States)	5	0	0	0	0	0	–	–	–	0	0	0	0	0	0	5	0	0
~~32~~	DF	Noah Allen (Note: Player transferred out during the season)	(Greece)	19	12	1	–	–	–	2	1	0	3	3	0	–	–	–	24	16	1
Midfielders
5	MF	Casemiro	(Brazil)	18	18	3	1	1	0	–	–	–	3	3	0	1	1	1	23	23	4
7	MF	Rodrigo De Paul	(Argentina)	29	29	6	1	1	0	2	2	0	3	3	1	1	1	0	36	36	7
8	MF	Telasco Segovia	(Venezuela)	30	24	3	1	1	0	2	2	0	3	3	1	0	0	0	36	30	4
20	MF	Santiago Morales	(United States)	3	1	0	0	0	0	0	0	0	0	0	0	0	0	0	3	1	0
22	MF	David Ayala	(Argentina)	17	9	0	0	0	0	1	0	0	2	0	0	0	0	0	20	9	0
42	MF	Yannick Bright	(Italy)	26	23	0	1	1	0	2	2	0	3	3	1	1	1	0	33	30	1
59	MF	Preston Plambeck	(United States)	6	0	1	0	0	0	–	–	–	2	0	0	0	0	0	8	0	1
80	MF	Matías Galarza	(Paraguay)	9	6	0	1	0	0	–	–	–	–	–	–	1	1	0	11	7	0
88	MF	Alexander Shaw	(United States)	7	0	1	1	0	0	–	–	–	0	0	0	1	0	0	9	0	1
~~41~~	MF	David Ruiz	(Honduras)	9	3	0	–	–	–	0	0	0	2	0	0	–	–	–	11	3	0
Forwards
9	FW	Luis Suárez	(Uruguay)	30	25	17	1	1	0	1	0	0	0	0	0	1	1	0	33	27	17
10	FW	Lionel Messi	(Argentina)	31	29	26	1	1	0	2	2	1	2	1	2	1	1	1	37	34	30
11	FW	Riquelme Fillipi	(Brazil)	7	2	1	0	0	0	–	–	–	–	–	–	0	0	0	7	2	1
19	FW	Germán Berterame	(Mexico)	30	27	10	1	1	0	2	2	0	0	0	0	1	1	0	34	31	10
21	FW	Tadeo Allende	(Argentina)	9	4	0	0	0	0	2	2	0	0	0	0	0	0	0	11	6	0
24	FW	Mateo Silvetti	(Argentina)	14	10	3	0	0	0	2	0	0	1	0	0	0	0	0	17	10	3
54	FW	Lovend's Delinois	(Haiti)	2	0	0	0	0	0	–	–	–	2	2	0	0	0	0	4	2	0
56	FW	Dániel Pintér	(United States)	14	4	1	0	0	0	0	0	0	3	3	1	0	0	0	17	7	2
Total				34		78	1		0	2		1	3		7	1		2	41		88

=== Goalscorers ===
Rank	Pos.	No.	Player	MLS	PO	CCC	LC	CC	Total
1	FW	10	(Argentina) Lionel Messi	26	0	1	2	1	30
2	FW	9	(Uruguay) Luis Suárez	17	0	0	0	0	17
3	FW	19	(Mexico) Germán Berterame	10	0	0	0	0	10
4	MF	7	(Argentina) Rodrigo De Paul	6	0	0	1	0	7
5	MF	5	(Brazil) Casemiro	3	0	0	0	1	4
5	MF	8	(Venezuela) Telasco Segovia	3	0	0	1	0	4
7	FW	24	(Argentina) Mateo Silvetti	3	0	0	0	0	3
8	DF	17	(Jamaica) Ian Fray	2	0	0	0	0	2
8	DF	16	(Brazil) Micael	1	0	0	1	0	2
8	FW	56	(United States) Dániel Pintér	1	0	0	1	0	2
11	DF	~~32~~	(Greece) Noah Allen	1	0	0	0	0	1
11	MF	42	(Italy) Yannick Bright	0	0	0	1	0	1
11	DF	2	(Argentina) Gonzalo Luján	1	0	0	0	0	1
11	MF	59	(United States) Preston Plambeck	1	0	0	0	0	1
11	DF	3	(Spain) Sergio Reguilón	1	0	0	0	0	1
11	FW	11	(Brazil) Riquelme Fillipi	1	0	0	0	0	1
11	MF	88	(United States) Alexander Shaw	1	0	0	0	0	1
Own goals				2	0	0	0	0	2
Total				80	0	1	7	2	90

=== Assists ===
Rank	Pos.	No.	Player	MLS	PO	CCC	LC	CC	Total
1	FW	10	(Argentina) Lionel Messi	15	0	0	1	1	17
2	MF	7	(Argentina) Rodrigo De Paul	10	0	0	0	0	10
2	MF	8	(Venezuela) Telasco Segovia	10	0	0	0	0	10
4	FW	19	(Mexico) Germán Berterame	8	0	0	0	0	8
4	FW	9	(Uruguay) Luis Suárez	7	0	0	0	1	8
6	DF	~~32~~	(Greece) Noah Allen	1	0	0	3	0	4
7	DF	17	(Jamaica) Ian Fray	2	0	0	1	0	3
7	FW	24	(Argentina) Mateo Silvetti	3	0	0	0	0	3
9	MF	5	(Brazil) Casemiro	1	0	0	1	0	2
10	MF	42	(Italy) Yannick Bright	1	0	0	0	0	1
10	DF	3	(Spain) Sergio Reguilón	0	0	1	0	0	1
Total				58	0	1	6	2	67

=== Clean sheets ===
Rank	No.	Player	MLS	PO	CCC	LC	CC	Total
1	97	(Canada) Dayne St. Clair	4	0	1	0	1	6
2	34	(Argentina) Rocco Ríos Novo	2	0	0	0	0	2
Total			6	0	1	0	1	8
