= Dániel Pintér =

American soccer player (born 2007)

Personal information
- Date of birth: June 6, 2007 (age 19)
- Place of birth: United States
- Position: Winger

Team information
- Current team: Inter Miami
- Number: 56

Youth career
- Boynton Knights
- South Florida Football Academy
- Palm Beach United
- 2019–2025: Inter Miami

Senior career*
Years	Team	Apps	(Gls)
2024–2025	Inter Miami II	19	(10)
2025	→ Inter Miami (loan)	1	(0)
2026–	Inter Miami	1	(0)

International career^{‡}
2023	Hungary U16	1	(0)
2024	Hungary U17	2	(0)
2024–2025	United States U18	4	(1)
2025–	United States U19	1	(2)
- * Club domestic league appearances and goals as of March 14, 2026 ‡ National team caps and goals as of October 14, 2025

Dániel Pintér (born June 6, 2007) is an American professional soccer player who plays as a winger for Major League Soccer club Inter Miami CF. He has represented the United States and Hungary in youth levels.

== Club career ==
Pintér spent his entire youth career in the state of Florida and signed for Inter Miami's academy in 2019, forming part of their inaugural class.

Pintér made his professional debut for Inter Miami II in the MLS Next Pro on March 24, 2024, coming on as a substitute in the 90th-minute for Yannick Bright in the 3–3 away draw against the New York Red Bulls II, he also scored his first professional goal that would tie the game in the 97th-minute.

On September 13, 2025, Pintér made his Major League Soccer debut in a 3–0 away loss against Charlotte FC, coming on as a substitute in the 70th-minute for Telasco Segovia. Pintér was eventually signed by the first team as a homegrown player on January 22, 2026.

== International career ==
Pintér has represented both the United States and Hungary in various youth levels.

== Honors ==
Inter Miami

- Campeones Cup: 2026
