= Cruz Azul v Inter Miami CF (2023 Leagues Cup) =

Soccer game in Florida on July 2023

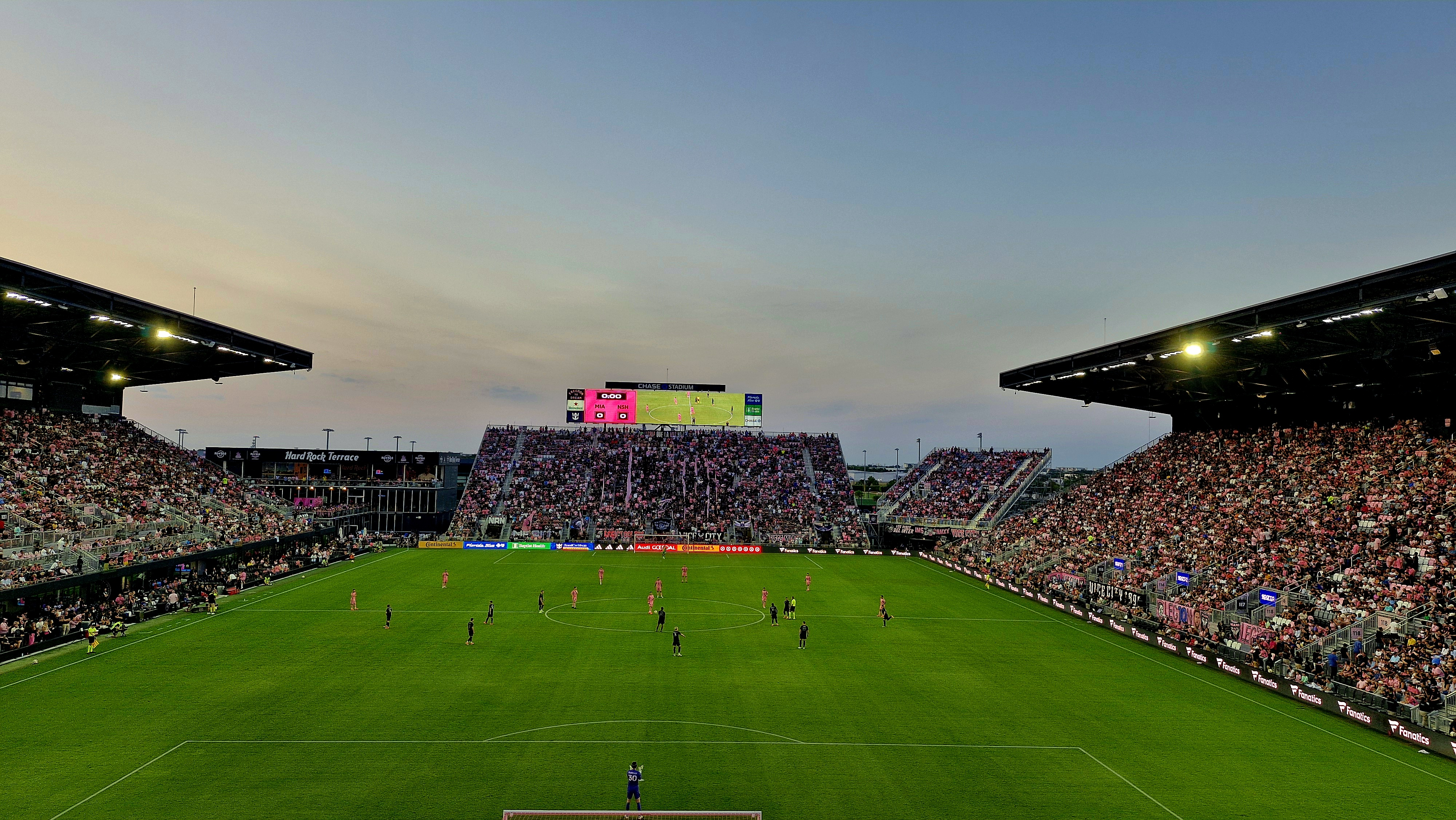
- DRV PNK Stadium, venue of the game
- Event: 2023 Leagues Cup
Cruz Azul	Inter Miami CF
(Mexico)	(United States)
1	2
- Date: July 21, 2023
- Venue: DRV PNK Stadium, Fort Lauderdale, Florida
- Man of the Match pres. by GEICO: Lionel Messi, Forward (Inter Miami CF)
- Referee: Saíd Martínez (Honduras)
- Attendance: 20,512

On July 21, 2023, two professional soccer clubs, Cruz Azul and Inter Miami CF, played against each other in the 2023 Leagues Cup group stage at DRV PNK Stadium, Fort Lauderdale, Florida, United States. This game garnered global media attention for being the official debut of Argentine player Lionel Messi for Inter Miami CF, alongside his former Barcelona teammate Sergio Busquets. The game ended with a 2–1 win for Inter Miami after Messi scored a free-kick in the final minutes of the game.

After the game, Inter Miami CF went on to win against Atlanta United FC, securing the top spot in South 3 group with six points, ahead of Cruz Azul with two points, and advancing to the knockout stage. Inter Miami CF then successively defeated Orlando City SC in round of 32, FC Dallas in round of 16, Charlotte FC in quarter-finals, and Philadelphia Union in semi-finals before winning against Nashville SC on penalties in the final to claim the championship. Cruz Azul was eliminated in the round of 32, losing to Charlotte FC in a 0–0 draw but lost 3–4 on penalties.

This victory snapped a poor run of form for Inter Miami CF and provided crucial momentum for the team to go on and win that season's Leagues Cup. It also marked the beginning of a successful era for the club following the signing of Lionel Messi in July 2023, a period that included the 2024 Supporters' Shield and their first-ever MLS Cup title in 2025. Messi's presence also helped elevate the club's international profile and generated greater public interest in the United States in soccer, a sport that had not historically been the most popular in the country.

== Background ==
The 2023 Leagues Cup is the third edition of the Leagues Cup, an international club soccer tournament between Major League Soccer (MLS) and Liga MX. It was held from July 21 to August 19, 2023, with all 77 matches held in either Canada and the United States. The tournament was organized by the two leagues (MLS and Liga MX) and sanctioned by CONCACAF, the continental governing body for the sport in North America, Central America and Caribbean. This tournament was the first edition where all MLS and Liga MX teams participated. The MLS Cup 2022 winners (Los Angeles FC) and the 2022 Clausura or 2022 Apertura champions with the highest aggregate points accumulated across 2022 (Pachuca) qualified automatically for the round of 32. The remaining 45 teams were placed into 15 groups of three.

For the group stage, teams played one match against each team in their group. Regulation wins were worth three points and regulation losses are zero points. Matches tied after 90 minutes advanced to a penalty shoot-out, where the winner earned two points and the loser earned one. All matches were held in either Canada and United States, with the MLS teams playing at home and intra-Liga MX matches played at MLS venues depending on their region. Matches disrupted by inclement weather, including thunderstorms, were delayed or postponed to another date to resume at the time of the stoppage.

== Teams ==
=== Cruz Azul ===
Cruz Azul entered the 2023 Leagues Cup with a lackluster domestic record and significant pressure to perform. Despite being the first champions of the tournament in 2019 under the old format, the Mexican club failed to maintain a consistent position before the 2023 season officially kicked off in the summer. In the Liga MX Apertura 2023, Cruz Azul, under coach Ricardo Ferretti, had what is considered their worst start in years. The team lost all three opening games against Atlas (0–2), Toluca (0–2), and Club Tijuana (1–2), dropping to 16th place in the standings (16th out of 18 teams). The main reasons for this result were the ineffective attack, scoring only one goal in three games, combined with systemic errors in defense.

In terms of personnel, the Cruz Azul squad that year had a relatively young average age, around 25 years old. The team's core was a combination of Mexican domestic players like Uriel Antuna and Carlos Rodríguez, and foreign players from South America like Moisés. Despite possessing national team players, the team's playing style at that time still lacked the necessary cohesion under coach Ferretti's philosophy.

=== Inter Miami CF ===
Inter Miami CF entered MLS as an expansion team in 2020 and had yet to advance to a prior tournament final. The team finished twelfth in the 2022 regular season standings and were seeded into the South 3 group. Before the Leagues Cup break, Miami were at the bottom of the Eastern Conference in regular season play with 18 points in 22 matches and on an 11-match winless streak. During the 2023 summer transfer window, the club signed forward Lionel Messi, midfielder Sergio Busquets, and defender Jordi Alba, all former FC Barcelona players and among the world's best in their positions; Inter Miami CF also signed a trio of young South American prospects to under-22 Designated Player contracts and offloaded veteran players to keep salary costs manageable and under the cap. Head coach Phil Neville was fired on June 1 and temporarily replaced by assistant Javier Morales until Gerardo "Tata" Martino joined in July.

== Pre-game ==
Lionel Messi's appearance generated huge commercial demand and drove up ticket prices. Although the organizers initially listed prices at $200 to $340 for corner seats, average ticket prices on secondary trading platforms like Vivid Seats and StubHub increased by nearly 1000% immediately after the match schedule was confirmed. Resale prices for seats closest to the pitch ranged from $10,000 to over $50,000, with some exceptional VIP seats reaching a maximum of $110,000. To accommodate the increased number of spectators, the DRV PNK stadium management had to install additional stands to raise the capacity to approximately 18,000 to 21,000 seats.

The match attracted a large number of celebrities from various fields in the VIP stands, including athletes LeBron James, Serena Williams, club co-owner David Beckham and his wife Victoria Beckham, as well as entertainment figures such as Kim Kardashian, Marc Anthony and Becky G. From a commercial standpoint, Messi's number 10 jersey, priced at $199, saw rapid sales, causing fans to queue for hours at stores around the stadium due to disruptions in online supply before the match. Even the prestigious fashion magazine Vogue ranked Messi's Inter Miami number 10 jersey among the top 15 most attractive and trendsetting fashion items of 2023. On digital platforms, the number of users subscribing to Apple TV's MLS Season Pass to watch the match live grew significantly, and footage of Messi's movements, warm-ups, and bench appearances consistently topped trending lists on social media around the time of the match.

== Game summary ==
=== Lineups ===
Cruz Azul employed a 4–2–3–1 formation. Goalkeeper Andrés Gudiño defended the goal. The back four consisted of Rodrigo Huescas, Rafael Guerrero, Carlos Salcedo, and Ignacio Rivero. Jesús Dueñas and Carlos Rodríguez occupied the defensive midfield positions. The attacking midfielders were Uriel Antuna, Moisés, and Carlos Rotondi, supporting striker Diber Cambindo. Due to injury, defender Rodrigo Huescas had to leave the field early in the 30th minute and was replaced by Juan Marcelo Escobar. On the Inter Miami CF side, coach Gerardo Martino deployed a 4–3–3 formation. Drake Callender was the starting goalkeeper. The defense consisted of four defenders: DeAndre Yedlin, Serhiy Kryvtsov, Kamal Miller, and Ian Fray. The midfield was manned by Benjamin Cremaschi, Dixon Arroyo, and David Ruiz. The three forwards were Robert Taylor, Leonardo Campana, and Robbie Robinson. Similar to their opponents, Inter Miami CF also had to make a mandatory substitution at the 30th minute when Noah Allen came on to replace Ian Fray.

=== Details ===
External videos
- Match highlights on the Major League Soccer's official YouTube channel
- Lionel Messi's free kick goal at stoppage time on the Major League Soccer's official YouTube channel

Cruz Azul kicked off at 20:00 p.m. under clear skies and in front of 20,512 spectators. The match opened with a goal in the 44th minute by Robert Taylor of Inter Miami CF. In the second half, in the 54th minute, Lionel Messi and Sergio Busquets were brought on to replace Cremaschi and Ruiz. Shortly after, Josef Martínez also came on for Campana. In the 65th minute, striker Uriel Antuna scored the equalizer for Cruz Azul with a shot inside the penalty area. In the following period, both teams made tactical substitutions, including Kevin Castaño, Augusto Lotti, and Christian Tabó coming on for the Cruz Azul, and Christopher McVey coming on for the Inter Miami CF.

In the fourth minute of stoppage time in the second half (90+4'), Inter Miami CF were awarded a free kick outside the penalty area. Lionel Messi converted the free kick into the net, securing a 2–1 victory for Inter Miami CF before the referee blew the final whistle.

=== Box score ===
July 21, 2023
8:00 p.m. EDT

Cruz Azul (Mexico)	1–2	(United States) Inter Miami CF
Uriel Antuna 65'	Report	Robert Taylor 44'; Lionel Messi 90+4'

DRV PNK Stadium, Fort Lauderdale, Florida
Attendance: 20,512
Referee: Saíd Martínez (Honduras)

Cruz Azul	Inter Miami CF

GK	30	(Mexico) Andrés Gudiño
RB	18	(Mexico) Rodrigo Huescas		(substituted off) 30'
CB	3	(Mexico) Carlos Salcedo
CB	33	(Mexico) Rafael Guerrero
LB	15	(Uruguay) Ignacio Rivero
DM	19	(Mexico) Carlos Rodríguez		(substituted off) 78'
DM	8	(Mexico) Jesús Dueñas	(yellow card) 90+2'
AM	10	(Brazil) Moisés		(substituted off) 78'
LW	29	(Argentina) Carlos Rotondi
RW	7	(Mexico) Uriel Antuna
ST	28	(Colombia) Diber Cambindo		(substituted off) 64'
Substitutions:
RB	24	(Paraguay) Juan Marcelo Escobar		(substituted on) 30'
DM	5	(Colombia) Kevin Castaño		(substituted on) 64'
AM	11	(Uruguay) Christian Tabó		(substituted on) 78'
FW	21	(Argentina) Augusto Lotti		(substituted on) 78'
Manager:
(Brazil) (Mexico) Ricardo Ferretti

GK	1	(United States) Drake Callender
RB	2	(United States) DeAndre Yedlin
CB	31	(Canada) Kamal Miller		(substituted off) 74'
CB	27	(Ukraine) Serhiy Kryvtsov
LB	24	(Jamaica) Ian Fray		(substituted off) 30'
CM	30	(United States) Benjamin Cremaschi		(substituted off) 54'
AM	3	(Ecuador) Dixon Arroyo	(yellow card) 38'
CM	41	(Honduras) David Ruiz		(substituted off) 54'
LW	19	(United States) Robbie Robinson
ST	9	(Ecuador) Leonardo Campana		(substituted off) 55'
RW	16	(Finland) Robert Taylor
Substitutions:
DF	32	(Greece) Noah Allen		(substituted on) 30'
FW	10	(Argentina) Lionel Messi		(substituted on) 54'
CM	5	(Spain) Sergio Busquets		(substituted on) 54'
ST	17	(Venezuela) Josef Martínez		(substituted on) 55'
CB	4	(Sweden) Christopher McVey		(substituted on) 74'
Manager:
(Argentina) Gerardo Martino

Man of the Match:
Lionel Messi (Inter Miami CF)

Linesman:
Walter López (Guatemala)
Christian Ramírez (Guatemala)
Fourth official:
Nelson Salgado (Guatemala)
Video assistant referee:
Luis Enrique Santander (Mexico)

Match rules

- 90 minutes
- Penalty shoot-out if scores level
- Maximum of fifteen named substitutes
- Maximum of five substitutions

Scoring summary
Half	Team	Scorer	Assist(s)	Minute	Score
1st	MIA	Robert Taylor (16)	Robbie Robinson (19)	44	1–0 MIA
2nd	CAZ	Uriel Antuna (7)	Jesús Dueñas (8)	65	1–1
2nd	MIA	Lionel Messi (10)	Free kick goal	90+4	2–1 MIA
Card summary
Half	Team	Player	Reason	Minute	Color
1st	MIA	Dixon Arroyo (3)	Bad foul	38	Yellow
2nd	CAZ	Jesús Dueñas (8)	Bad foul	90+2	Yellow

=== Statistical comparison ===
Team-to-team comparison
Statistic	Cruz Azul	Inter Miami CF
Goal scored	1	2
Shots	18	12
Shots on target	8	6
Saves	4	7
Ball possession	48%	53%
Corner kicks	8	4
Fouls committed	12	14
Offsides	2	2
Yellow cards	1	1
Red cards	0	0

== Post-game ==
According to CNN, Messi's substitution from the bench in the 54th minute marked a turning point in the match, culminating in the decisive free-kick goal in the 90+4 minute. Meanwhile, CBS Sports described the goal's trajectory as aesthetically pleasing. The sports newspaper Marca considered Messi's goal one of the most significant milestones since the founding of Inter Miami CF. International media also quoted club co-owner David Beckham praising the Argentine superstar's performance on live television. Besides the factual events, several news outlets such as Reuters and the Spanish newspaper Diaro AS have provided expert analysis of Inter Miami CF's playing style. Experts pointed out that the American team still showed many weaknesses in their defensive system, allowing Cruz Azul to take a total of 18 shots. The media suggested that Inter Miami CF might have suffered an unfavorable result if not for the outstanding performance of goalkeeper Drake Callender with 7 saves in the match, before Messi sealed the 2–1 victory.

"What I saw was the goal. I saw the goal. I knew that I had to score. It was the last play of the game and I wanted to score so I didn't go to penalties."

— Lionel Messi, in an interview with the press after the match.

In a live interview at the stadium immediately after the match ended, Lionel Messi explained his tactical thinking and purpose in taking the free kick in the 90+4th minute. According to reports distributed by the Associated Press (AP), Messi stated that he was aware it was the final moment of the match and deliberately took the shot to settle the game within regular time, avoiding the risks of a penalty shootout in the group stage of the League Cup. Additionally, CNN noted that Messi emphasized the importance of this result for the club's overall morale in a new season, asserting that this victory would boost the team's confidence for the next phase of competition.

Coach Gerardo Martino offered his assessment of both Messi's decisive moment and the overall performance of Inter Miami CF. Regarding the winning goal, Martino shared that the coaching staff and spectators alike had faith in Messi's ability to succeed when the penalty was awarded, describing the moment as "a movie we've seen before". However, from a collective perspective, the Argentinian strategist offered frank, technical assessments rather than focusing solely on media hype. Martino admitted that Inter Miami CF had a poor game, particularly in the first half when Cruz Azul repeatedly created clear scoring opportunities. He concluded that the team still showed many defensive weaknesses, emphasizing that the coaching staff and players needed more time to optimize their collective play and integrate new personnel into the system, also argued that Cruz Azul played much better in the first 45 minutes and had superior ball control, and asserted that if the Mexican forwards had been more accurate in their finishing, the outcome of the match would have been very different. The El País report notes that the match began with complete dominance from the Cruz Azul, as their strikers repeatedly missed clear-cut opportunities to take the lead in the first half. The article also highlights the role of goalkeeper Drake Callender in making a series of saves for Inter Miami against defensive weaknesses, mirroring Martino's later admission of the team's poor performance and how outmatched they were before the new stars came on.

== Later games ==
Final South 3 standings at the 2023 Leagues Cup group stage
Pos	Team	Pld	W	PW	PL	L	GF	GA	GD	Pts	Qualification
1	(United States) Inter Miami CF	2	2	0	0	0	6	1	+5	6	Advance to knockout stage
2	(Mexico) Cruz Azul	2	0	1	0	1	2	3	−1	2	Advance to knockout stage
3	(United States) Atlanta United FC	2	0	0	1	1	1	5	−4	1	

Source: Leagues Cup
Rules for classification: Tiebreakers

Games of Cruz Azul and Inter Miami CF after July 21
Cruz Azul (Result: Round of 32)

Round	Date	Opponent	Location	Stadium	Result (Note: Team's score written first)	Scorer	Referee	Attendance
M2	July 29	(United States) Atlanta United FC	Nashville, Tennessee	Geodis Park	D 1–1 (5–4 p)	Fafà Picault 57'	Ismail Elfath	30,109
R32	August 3	(United States) Charlotte FC	Frisco, Texas (Note: Due to a scheduling conflict at Bank of America Stadium, Charlotte FC elected to host their Round of 32 match at Toyota Stadium in Frisco, Texas, the home of FC Dallas.)	Toyota	D 0–0 (3–4 p)	No goals	Ismael Cornejo	6,844

Inter Miami CF (Result: Winner)

Round	Date	Opponent	Location	Stadium	Result	Scorer	Referee	Attendance
M2	July 25	(United States) Atlanta United FC	Fort Lauderdale, Florida	DRV PNK	W 4–0	Lionel Messi 8', 22'; Robert Taylor 44', 53'	Mario Escobar	19,578
R32	August 2	(United States) Orlando City SC	Fort Lauderdale, Florida	DRV PNK	W 3–1	Lionel Messi 7', 12'; Josef Martínez 51' (pen.)	Iván Barton	20,181
R16	August 6	(United States) FC Dallas	Frisco, Texas	Toyota	D 4–4 (5–3 p)	Lionel Messi 6', 85'; Benjamin Cremaschi 65'; Marco Farfan 80' (o.g.)	César Ramos	19,096
QF	August 11	(United States) Charlotte FC	Fort Lauderdale, Florida	DRV PNK	W 4–0	Josef Martínez 12' (pen.); Robert Taylor 32'; Adilson Malanda 78' (o.g.); Lionel Messi 86'	Ismail Elfath	20,368
SF	August 15	(United States) Philadelphia Union	Chester, Pennsylvania	Subaru Park	W 4–1	Josef Martínez 3'; Lionel Messi 20'; Jordi Alba 45+3'; David Ruiz 84'	Daniel Quintero Huitrón	19,778
F	August 19	(United States) Nashville SC	Nashville, Tennessee	Geodis Park	D 1–1 (10–9 p)	Lionel Messi 23'	Ismail Elfath	30,109

In the second game of the South 3 group, Inter Miami CF faced Atlanta United FC, Lionel Messi made his first start, scoring two goals and providing one assist, helping the club secure a 4–0 victory, Cruz Azul, on the other hand, defeated Atlanta United FC after a 1–1 draw in regulation time, but ultimately won 5–4 on penalties. This result placed Inter Miami CF at the top of the South 3 group with a perfect 6 points and secured their place in the knockout round. Inter Miami CF then faced Orlando City SC in the round of 32. The match ended with a 3–1 victory for Inter Miami CF, with Messi scoring two goals. While Cruz Azul suffered a defeat against Charlotte FC in this session, drawing 0–0 but losing 3–4 on penalties.

Inter Miami advanced to the round of 16 and faced FC Dallas four days later in their first away match of the tournament, which was played with additional security guards and in front of a mixed crowd of home supporters and Messi fans. Inter Miami CF trailed 4–2 until the 80th minute. Then, an own goal by an FC Dallas player and a free-kick goal from Messi in the 85th minute leveled the score at 4–4. In the penalty shootout, Inter Miami CF won 5–3 after successfully converting all five of their penalties. Then they returned home and won 4–0 against Charlotte FC in the semi-finals, with Messi scoring the final goal in the 86th minute. Advancing to the semi-finals, the club traveled to Subaru Park to face Philadelphia Union. Inter Miami CF took a 3–0 lead in the first half thanks to goals from Josef Martínez, Messi, and Jordi Alba, before closing out a 4–1 victory to advance to the final.

In the final against Nashville SC, each team drew 1–1 in regulation time. And in the early rounds of the shootout, only Randall Leal of Nashville and Víctor Ulloa of Miami missed their shots. Jordi Alba scored his first career shootout goal; Ulloa's miss sent the shootout into sudden death rounds. The deciding eleventh round was contested by the two goalkeepers: Drake Callender converted his and then saved Panicco's to win the shootout by a 10–9 scoreline.

== Influence ==
The result from this game marked the beginning of Inter Miami's seven-game unbeaten streak in the 2023 Leagues Cup, helping the club win its first title since its founding after defeating Nashville SC on penalties in the final. Lionel Messi finished the tournament as the top scorer (10 goals) and the best player of the tournament. After the Leagues Cup, the team went on to reach the 2023 U.S. Open Cup final where they lost to Houston Dynamo FC 1–2 and finished as runners-up. In Major League Soccer (MLS), despite failing to qualify for the playoffs in the 2023 season due to low points from the previous phase, Inter Miami showed significant improvement in performance in the 2024 season, the team won the 2024 Supporters' Shield with a record 74 points in the Regular Season, culminating in 2025 when they officially won the MLS Cup for the first time in the team's history.

Messi's appearance in the game against Cruz Azul also significantly impacted the level of interest among American audiences in soccer, especially Major League Soccer, a sport with lower viewership compared to the National Football League (NFL), National Basketball Association (NBA), or Major League Baseball (MLB). Many MLS clubs have moved Inter Miami's games to larger football stadiums to accommodate increased audience demand. In the 2024 season, the game between Sporting Kansas City and Inter Miami at Arrowhead Stadium recorded 72,610 spectators. By early 2026, Inter Miami's away games continued to attract large audiences, including 75,673 spectators at LAFC's Los Angeles Memorial Coliseum and 75,824 spectators at Colorado Rapids's Empower Field at Mile High. The game against D.C. United's performance at M&T Bank Stadium in Baltimore also attracted 72,026 spectators, setting a new record for soccer attendance at the stadium.

From a commercial and media perspective, the number of subscribers to the MLS Season Pass on Apple TV grew significantly after Messi's debut match. At the end of the 2024 season, total attendance across the MLS reached a record high of over 11,45 million, an increase of approximately 14% compared to 2022, while revenue from commercial sponsorship deals increased by 13%. Inter Miami's home games at Chase Stadium also saw regular appearances from many famous figures in the US entertainment and sports industries, contributing to increased commercial value and image rights for the entire league ahead of the 2026 FIFA World Cup.
