= Sergio Reguilón =

Spanish footballer (born 1996)

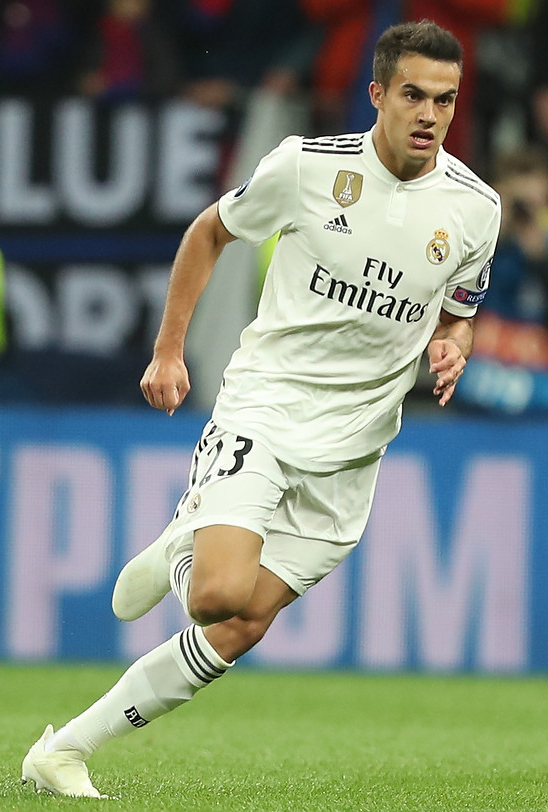
- Reguilón playing for Real Madrid in 2018

Personal information
- Full name: Sergio Reguilón Rodríguez
- Date of birth: 16 December 1996 (age 29)
- Place of birth: Madrid, Spain
- Height: 1.78 m (5 ft 10 in)
- Position: Left-back

Team information
- Current team: Inter Miami
- Number: 3

Youth career
- 2000–2003: Fundación Real Madrid Becerril
- 2003–2005: EFM Villalba
- 2005–2015: Real Madrid

Senior career*
Years	Team	Apps	(Gls)
2015–2018	Real Madrid Castilla	48	(2)
2015–2016	→ Logroñés (loan)	9	(0)
2016–2017	→ Logroñés (loan)	30	(8)
2018–2020	Real Madrid	14	(0)
2019–2020	→ Sevilla (loan)	31	(2)
2020–2025	Tottenham Hotspur	56	(2)
2022–2023	→ Atlético Madrid (loan)	11	(0)
2023–2024	→ Manchester United (loan)	9	(0)
2024	→ Brentford (loan)	16	(0)
2025–	Inter Miami	20	(1)

International career
2019	Spain U21	1	(0)
2020–2021	Spain	6	(0)
Medal record
Men's football
Representing Spain
UEFA Nations League
Runner-up	2021 Italy
- * Club domestic league appearances and goals as of 23:48, 7 November 2026 (UTC)

Sergio Reguilón Rodríguez (born 16 December 1996) is a Spanish professional footballer who plays as a left-back for Major League Soccer club Inter Miami.

Reguilón is a graduate of Real Madrid's youth academy. He made his senior debut in August 2015, while on loan at Logroñés. Reguilón made his first-team debut for Real Madrid in October 2018. He spent the 2019–20 season on loan at Sevilla, where he won the UEFA Europa League and was named in the Squad of the Season. Reguilón signed for Tottenham Hotspur in September 2020 and the club announced his departure at the end of the 2024–25 season.

== Club career ==
=== Real Madrid ===
Reguilón joined Real Madrid's youth system from EFM Villalba in 2005, aged eight. On 5 August 2015, he was loaned to Segunda División B side Logroñés for the season.

Reguilón made his senior debut on 23 August 2015, playing the last seven minutes in a 3–0 home win against Compostela. The following 16 January, after being sparingly used, he returned to Los Blancos and was assigned to the reserves also in the third division.

On 23 August 2016, Reguilón returned to Logroñés also in a one-year loan deal. Now an undisputed starter, he scored eight goals during the campaign; highlights included four past Bilbao Athletic on 2 October 2016 (5–3 home win).

Upon returning to Castilla, Reguilón was a first-choice in Santiago Solari's side, and renewed his contract on 11 May 2018. On 25 August of that year, he was promoted to the main squad by manager Julen Lopetegui.

Reguilón made his first-team debut for Real Madrid on 2 October 2018, starting in a 1–0 UEFA Champions League away loss against CSKA Moscow. He made his La Liga debut on 3 November 2018, starting in a 2–0 home win against Real Valladolid.

==== Loan to Sevilla ====
On 5 July 2019, Reguilón was loaned to Sevilla for the 2019–20 season. On his official debut on 18 August, he scored the opener in a 2–0 success over Espanyol at the RCDE Stadium.

With Sevilla, Reguilón established himself as a regular starter and won the 2019–20 UEFA Europa League.

=== Tottenham Hotspur ===
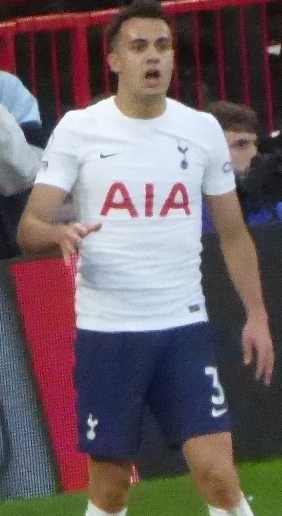
Reguilón playing for Tottenham Hotspur in 2022

On 19 September 2020, Reguilón joined Tottenham Hotspur on a five-year deal with a reported £27.5m buy-back clause. He made his debut on 29 September 2020, in the home game against Chelsea in the fourth round of the League Cup, in which he assisted teammate Erik Lamela's equalising goal, which was then followed by a penalty shootout. Spurs won 5–4 on penalties putting them through to the next round of the competition. He made his Premier League debut on 4 October, in a 6–1 win away to Manchester United. On 21 November 2021, Reguilón scored his first goal for Tottenham − the winning goal in a 2–1 Premier League victory over Leeds United.

==== Loans to Atlético Madrid, Manchester United and Brentford ====
On 30 August 2022, Reguilón returned to Spain, joining Atlético Madrid on loan until the end of the season. He made 12 appearances across all competitions for the Spanish club.

Upon returning to Tottenham, Reguilón joined Manchester United on a six-month loan on 1 September 2023 as emergency cover for the injured left-backs Luke Shaw and Tyrell Malacia. He returned to Tottenham on 2 January 2024, following the activation of a break clause within the loan agreement, as Shaw had by then recovered from his injury. During his four-month spell at Manchester United, Reguilón appeared in 12 matches.

==== Return to Tottenham and departure ====
Two weeks later, on 17 January 2024, Tottenham loaned Reguilón to fellow Premier League side Brentford until the end of the season. In the 2024–25 Premier League season, Reguilón appeared as a substitute for Tottenham regularly. However, he was excluded from their 2024–25 UEFA Europa League squad. Reguilón won the tournament with the club and was awarded a winners medal with Tottenham on 21 May 2025, despite not being part of the squad for the competition. Ten days later, on 31 May, Tottenham announced that Reguilón would leave the club upon the expiration of his contract.

=== Inter Miami ===
On 15 December 2025, Inter Miami announced that they have signed Reguilón through December 2027, with an option until 2028.

== International career ==
Reguilón was selected for the Spain under-21 team for the first time by Luis de la Fuente for the 2019 UEFA European Under-21 Championship qualifiers against Romania and Austria in March 2019. He made his debut, and only appearance at under-21 level, against Romania on 21 March.

He received his first call up to the senior team by Robert Moreno on 4 October 2019, for games against Norway and Sweden. Reguilón made his senior international debut on 6 September 2020, starting in Spain's 4–0 win over Ukraine in the 2020–21 UEFA Nations League.

== Personal life ==
Born in Madrid, his parents are from Zamora. He was in a relationship with internet celebrity Marta Díaz from 2019 to 2023. He grew up in Collado Villalba.

== Career statistics ==
=== Club ===
As of match played 7 November 2026

Appearances and goals by club, season and competition
Club	Season	League			National cup (Note: Includes Copa del Rey, FA Cup)		League cup (Note: Includes EFL Cup)		Continental		Other		Total	
Club	Season	Division	Apps	Goals	Apps	Goals	Apps	Goals	Apps	Goals	Apps	Goals	Apps	Goals
Real Madrid Castilla	2015–16	Segunda División B	18	0	—		—		—		—		18	0
Real Madrid Castilla	2017–18	Segunda División B	30	2	—		—		—		—		30	2
Real Madrid Castilla	Total		48	2	—		—		—		—		48	2
Logroñés (loan)	2015–16	Segunda División B	9	0	3	0	—		—		—		12	0
Logroñés (loan)	2016–17	Segunda División B	30	8	1	0	—		—		—		31	8
Logroñés (loan)	Total		39	8	4	0	—		—		—		43	8
Real Madrid	2018–19	La Liga	14	0	4	0	—		4 (Note: Appearances in UEFA Champions League)	0	0	0	22	0
Sevilla (loan)	2019–20	La Liga	31	2	2	0	—		5 (Note: Appearances in UEFA Europa League)	1	—		38	3
Tottenham Hotspur	2020–21	Premier League	27	0	1	0	3	0	5	0	—		36	0
Tottenham Hotspur	2021–22	Premier League	25	2	2	0	2	0	2 (Note: Appearances in UEFA Europa Conference League)	0	—		31	2
Tottenham Hotspur	2024–25	Premier League	4	0	1	0	1	0	0	0	—		6	0
Tottenham Hotspur	Total		56	2	4	0	6	0	7	0	—		73	2
Atlético Madrid (loan)	2022–23	La Liga	11	0	1	0	—		0	0	—		12	0
Manchester United (loan)	2023–24	Premier League	9	0	—		1	0	2	0	—		12	0
Brentford (loan)	2023–24	Premier League	16	0	—		—		—		—		16	0
Inter Miami	2026	MLS	20	1	—		—		1 (Note: Appearance in CONCACAF Champions Cup)	0	4 (Note: Three appearances in Leagues Cup, one appearance in Campeones Cup)	0	25	1
Career total			244	15	15	0	7	0	19	1	4	0	289	16

=== International ===
As of match played 8 September 2021

Appearances and goals by national team and year
National team	Year	Apps	Goals
Spain	2020	5	0
Spain	2021	1	0
Total		6	0

== Honours ==
Real Madrid

- FIFA Club World Cup: 2018

Sevilla

- UEFA Europa League: 2019–20

Tottenham Hotspur

- EFL Cup runner-up: 2020–21
- UEFA Europa League: 2024–25

Inter Miami

- Campeones Cup: 2026

Spain

- UEFA Nations League runner-up: 2020–21

Individual

- UEFA Europa League Squad of the Season: 2019–20
