= Fricio Caicedo =

Ecuadorian footballer (born 2008)

Personal information
- Full name: Fricio David Caicedo Jaramillo
- Date of birth: 17 April 2008 (age 18)
- Place of birth: Borbón Canton, Ecuador
- Height: 6 ft 4 in (1.93 m)
- Position: Centre-back

Team information
- Current team: Inter Miami (on loan from FC Moravia FCM)
- Number: 15

Youth career
- –2026: LDU Quito

Senior career*
Years	Team	Apps	(Gls)
2026–	FC Moravia FCM	0	(0)
2026–	→ Inter Miami (loan)	5	(0)

International career^{‡}
2024	Ecuador U15	6	(0)
2025	Ecuador U17	7	(0)
2025–	Ecuador U20	2	(0)
2026–	Ecuador	2	(0)
- * Club domestic league appearances and goals as of 03:01, 21 September 2026 (UTC) ‡ National team caps and goals as of 17:30, 5 October 2026 (UTC)

Fricio David Caicedo Jaramillo (born 17 April 2008) is an Ecuadorian footballer who currently plays as a centre-back for Major League Soccer (MLS) club Inter Miami, on loan from Segunda División de Costa Rica club FC Moravia FCM, and the Ecuador national team.

== Club career ==
Having not yet made his professional debut for LDU Quito, Caicedo drew attention from Belgian Pro League club Royal Antwerp. In December 2025, it was reported in Ecuador that Caicedo had agreed to join the Belgian club in July 2026.

=== Inter Miami CF ===
Caicedo came on loan from FC Moravia FCM in the 2026 MLS season, until the end of the 2027 MLS Sprint season.

== International career ==
After representing Ecuador at under-15, under-17 and under-20 level, Caicedo was called up to first team training by manager Sebastián Beccacece in May 2025. In May 2026 he was called up to the full squad for the first time, alongside a number of fellow youth players, for the country's training camp in the United States ahead of the 2026 FIFA World Cup. Caicedo made his international debut in Ecuador's 2–1 friendly win against Saudi Arabia on 30 May 2026, coming on as a late substitute for Pervis Estupiñán.

== Style of play ==
A left-footed centre-back, also capable of playing at left full-back, Caicedo's height makes him a major aerial presence.

== Personal life ==
Caicedo's brother is fellow footballer Fronny Caicedo, who currently plays for Royal Antwerp.

== Career statistics ==
=== International ===
As of match played 5 October 2026

Appearances and goals by national team and year
National team	Year	Apps	Goals
Ecuador	2026	2	0
Total		2	0

== Honours ==
Inter Miami

- Campeones Cup: 2026
