= Preston Plambeck =

American soccer player (born 2005)

Personal information
- Date of birth: December 20, 2005 (age 20)
- Place of birth: Bradenton, Florida, United States
- Height: 5 ft 11 in (1.80 m)
- Position: Midfielder

Team information
- Current team: Inter Miami
- Number: 59

Youth career
- –2025: Inter Miami

Senior career*
Years	Team	Apps	(Gls)
2025–	Inter Miami II	27	(3)
2026–	Inter Miami	4	(1)
- * Club domestic league appearances and goals as of July 22, 2026

Preston Plambeck (born December 20, 2005) is an American professional soccer player who plays as a midfielder for Major League Soccer club Inter Miami.

== Early life ==
Born in Bradenton, Florida, United States, Plambeck joined the Inter Miami academy.

== Club career ==
=== Inter Miami ===
Preston Plambeck would begin his senior career playing for academy side Inter Miami II. He would make his first appearance on April 7, 2025, scoring in a 3–2 defeat against Atlanta United 2.

In May 2026, Inter Miami signed Plambeck on a homegrown contract for the 2026 Major League Soccer season with options through 2028–29. On July 22, 2026 he would score his first MLS goal to win the game in the 87’ minute in a 3–2 game against Chicago Fire.

== Honors ==
Inter Miami

- Campeones Cup: 2026
