= Casemiro =

Brazilian footballer (born 1992)

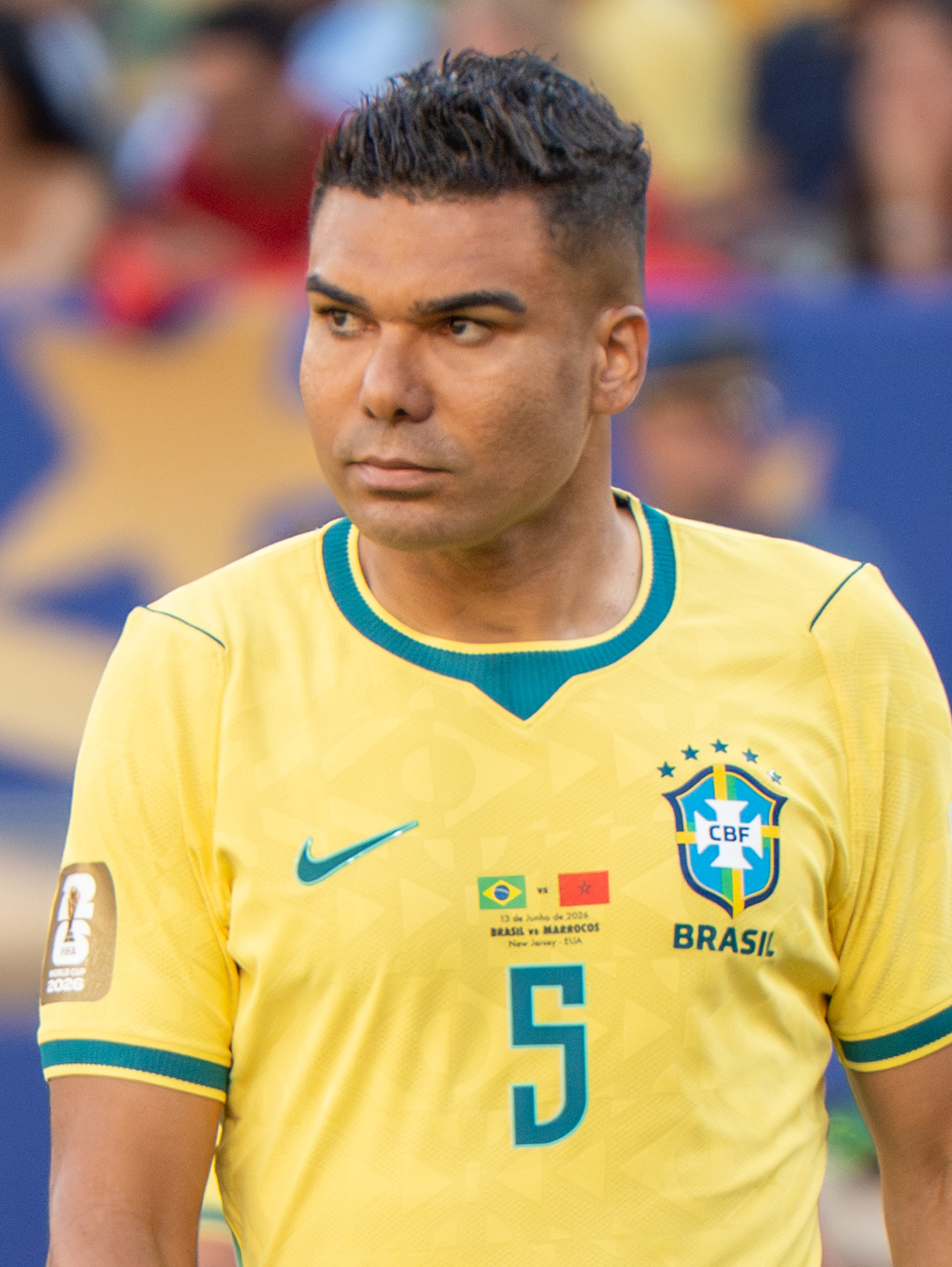
- Casemiro with Brazil in 2026

Personal information
- Full name: Carlos Henrique Casimiro
- Date of birth: 23 February 1992 (age 34)
- Place of birth: São José dos Campos, São Paulo, Brazil
- Height: 1.85 m (6 ft 1 in)
- Position: Defensive midfielder

Team information
- Current team: Inter Miami
- Number: 5

Youth career
- –2010: São Paulo

Senior career*
Years	Team	Apps	(Gls)
2010–2013	São Paulo	92	(9)
2013	→ Real Madrid Castilla (loan)	15	(1)
2013	→ Real Madrid (loan)	1	(0)
2013–2022	Real Madrid	221	(24)
2014–2015	→ Porto (loan)	28	(3)
2022–2026	Manchester United	111	(15)
2026–	Inter Miami	18	(3)

International career^{‡}
2009	Brazil U17	7	(1)
2011	Brazil U20	15	(3)
2011–	Brazil	91	(10)
Medal record
Men's football
Representing Brazil
Copa América
Winner	2019 Brazil
Runner-up	2021 Brazil
FIFA U-20 World Cup
Winner	2011 Colombia
South American U-20 Championship
Winner	2011 Peru
South American U-17 Championship
Winner	2009 Venezuela
- * Club domestic league appearances and goals as of 23:00, 7 November 2026 (UTC) ‡ National team caps and goals as of 22:13, 5 July 2026 (UTC)

Carlos Henrique Casimiro (born 23 February 1992), also known mononymously as Casemiro (Brazilian Portuguese: [kazeˈmiɾu]), is a Brazilian professional footballer who plays as a defensive midfielder for Major League Soccer club Inter Miami and the Brazil national team.

Casemiro began his career with São Paulo and progressed through the ranks. He scored 11 goals in 111 games as a midfielder for the club. His defensive abilities caught the attention of Real Madrid, and he joined the club on loan in January 2013. He played 15 games for Real Madrid Castilla during his loan spell. Afterward, he was signed permanently by Real Madrid for a fee of £5.1 million, becoming a part of their first-team squad at the Santiago Bernabéu. After joining Real Madrid, Casemiro initially struggled to break into the first team. He was loaned to Porto to gain more playing time. During his time at Porto, Casemiro performed impressively and helped the team reach the Champions League quarterfinals.

Porto had an option to buy Casemiro after his loan ended, but Real Madrid decided to cancel the clause, paying a €7 million penalty fee to Porto in the summer transfer window of 2015. After returning to the club, Casemiro played a crucial role in Real Madrid's success, becoming one of the best defensive midfielders in the world, and winning numerous trophies including three La Liga titles, three Supercopa de España, three FIFA Club World Cups, three UEFA Super Cups, one Copa del Rey, and five UEFA Champions Leagues. In 2022, he joined Manchester United for a transfer worth a reported €70.65m, winning the EFL Cup and FA Cup in his four seasons there.

Casemiro has been capped more than 90 times by Brazil since making his senior international debut in 2011. He was in Brazil's squad at three FIFA World Cups (2018, 2022, and 2026) as well as four Copa América tournaments, winning the 2019 Copa América and finishing as a runner-up in 2021. In 2021, he was included in the IFFHS CONMEBOL Team of the Decade.

== Club career ==
=== São Paulo ===
==== 2003–2010: Youth career ====
Born in São José dos Campos, São Paulo, Casemiro was a product of São Paulo FC's youth system. From the age of 11 upwards, he acted as captain to its sides; he was known as "Carlão" – an augmentative form of his first name in Portuguese – early on, and would be called up for the 2009 FIFA U-17 World Cup.

==== 2010–2013: Consistent success ====
Casemiro made his Série A debut on 25 July 2010, in an away loss against Santos. He scored his first goal as a professional on 15 August, helping to a 2–2 draw with Cruzeiro.

On 7 April 2012, Casemiro scored the first goal of a 2–0 win over Mogi Mirim at the Arena Barueri in that year's Campeonato Paulista after replacing the injured Fabrício early on, but was later sent off. São Paulo also won the Copa Sudamericana, with the player making one substitute appearance in a 5–0 home success against Universidad de Chile in the quarter-final second leg on 7 November.

=== Real Madrid ===
==== 2013–2015: First successes and loan to Porto ====
On 31 January 2013, Casemiro was loaned to Real Madrid in Spain, being assigned to the B-team in Segunda División. He played his first game in the competition on 16 February, starting in a 1–3 defeat at Sabadell. Casemiro made his La Liga debut on 20 April, playing the full 90 minutes in a 3–1 home win over Real Betis. On 2 June, he scored his first goal in Europe, opening the reserves' 4–0 win over Alcorcón at the Alfredo Di Stéfano Stadium. Eight days after his first goal for Real Madrid Castilla, the move was made permanent for four years and a fee of R$18.738 million was paid.

Casemiro was loaned to Porto on 19 July 2014 in a season-long loan. He totalled 41 games overall for the Portuguese club, scoring four goals, including a free kick on 10 March 2015 in a 4–0 home win over Basel in the last 16 of the UEFA Champions League.

==== 2015–2016: Becoming first-choice ====
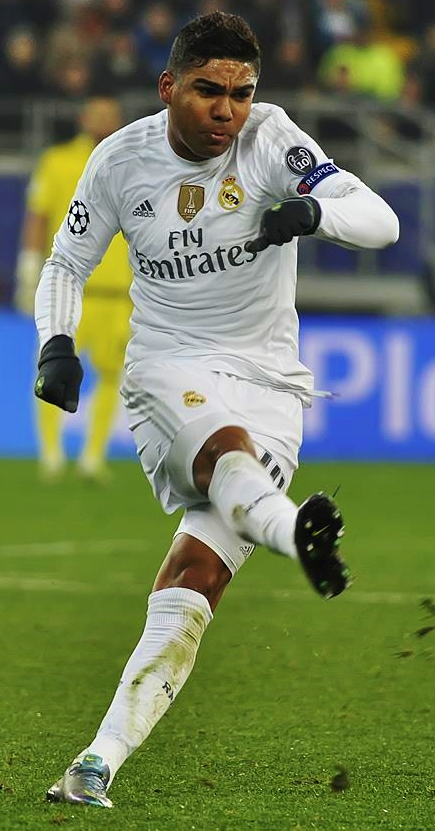
Casemiro playing for Real Madrid in 2015

On 5 June 2015, Casemiro returned to Real Madrid who activated his buyback clause, and two months later his contract was extended until 2021. On 13 March 2016, he scored his first competitive goal for the Merengues, heading home an 89th-minute corner kick by Jesé in a 2–1 victory at Las Palmas. After being mostly a reserve player under Rafael Benítez, Casemiro became first-choice under his successor Zinedine Zidane, and contributed with 11 appearances in that season's Champions League. In the final against Atlético Madrid, he featured the full 120 minutes, as Real Madrid won their 11th title in a penalty shoot-out after a 1–1 draw.

==== 2016–2022: Prolific success and departure ====
Casemiro scored four goals in 25 matches in the 2016–17 La Liga, helping his team win the league title for the first time in five years. He then scored a long-range strike in the Champions League final against Juventus, helping his team to a 4–1 victory. He again found the net on 8 August, putting his team ahead in a 2–1 victory over Manchester United in the 2017 UEFA Super Cup.

During the 2017–18 Champions League, Casemiro made 12 appearances while scoring one goal, as Madrid won their third consecutive and 13th overall title in the competition. He was a regular starter during the season, as Real Madrid won the 2019–20 La Liga. In August 2021, he extended his contract until June 2025. Casemiro was a starter for Real Madrid when they won their 14th Champions League title. He was named Man of the Match, as Real Madrid defeated Eintracht Frankfurt 2–0 for the 2022 Super Cup.

=== Manchester United ===
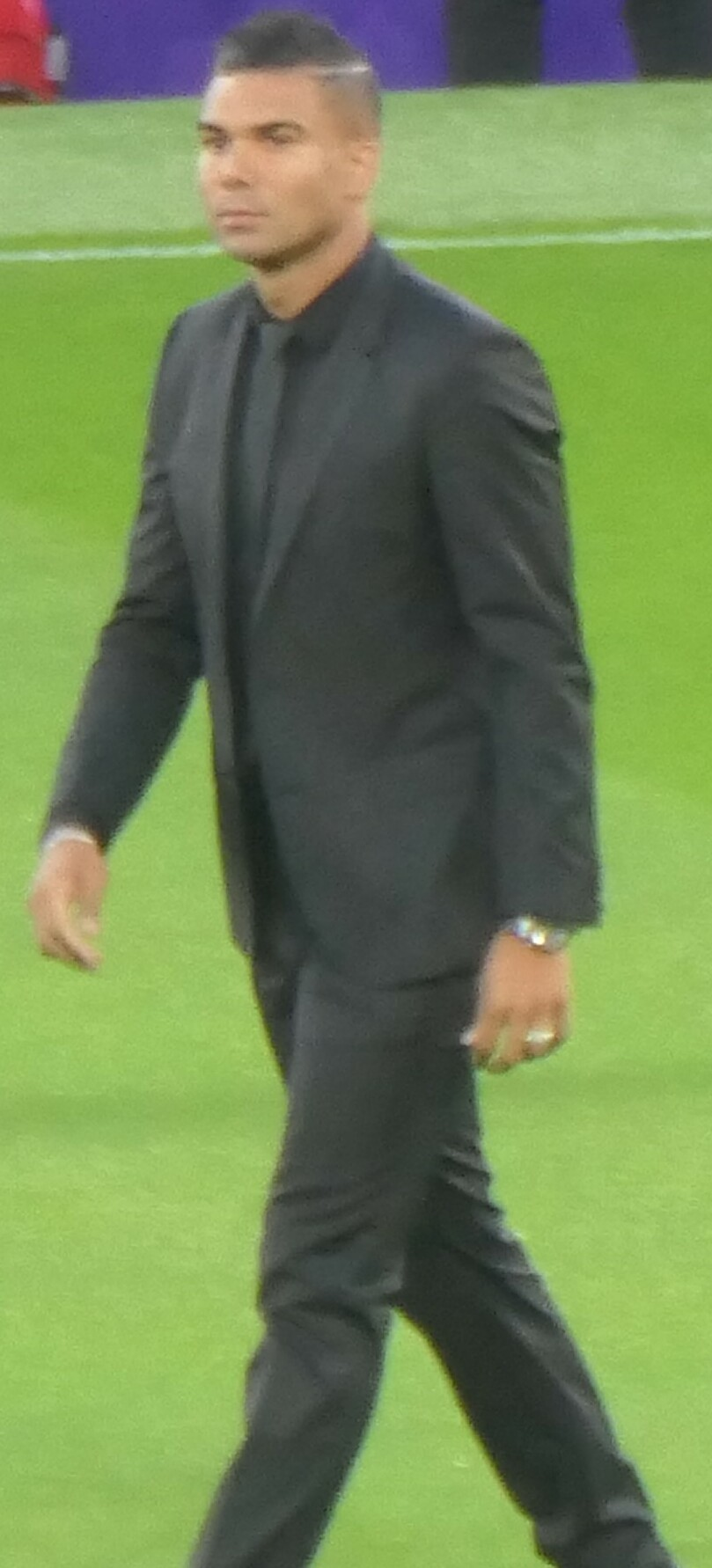
Casemiro during his unveiling as a new Manchester United player at Old Trafford in 2022

On 19 August 2022, Real Madrid and Manchester United announced that they had reached an agreement for the transfer of Casemiro. Three days later, he signed a four-year contract with the English club, with an option for an additional year's extension. The deal was reportedly worth £60 million, plus £10 million in add-ons. Casemiro was later reported as having previously told his agent to relay a message to Manchester United that he would bring them back into form after their 4–0 defeat at the hands of Brentford, saying "Tell them I’ll fix it." He made his debut for the club when he came on as a substitute in a Premier League win away at Southampton on 27 August. On 22 October, he scored his first Premier League goal, a last minute equaliser with a header in a 1–1 away draw against Chelsea.

Casemiro was highly praised by his manager Erik ten Hag in January, who commented: "Casemiro is magnificent. In front of the back line, always taking good positions, in and out of position. And he can deal with the ball, he can give the right pass. So, he can accelerate the game and if necessary, he can score." On 4 February, Casemiro was given a red card for violent conduct during a match against Crystal Palace for putting his hands around the neck of Will Hughes during a confrontation which also saw Antony and Jeffrey Schlupp receive yellow cards. This resulted in a three-match domestic ban; United would go on to win the match 2–1. On 26 February, Man Utd won the EFL Cup, his first trophy at the club and United's first trophy since 2017, with Casemiro scoring the opening goal in the 33rd minute of the 2–0 victory against Newcastle United in the final. His performance also earned him the Alan Hardaker Trophy. On 12 March, he was given a red card for a tackle on Carlos Alcaraz in a match against Southampton where referee Anthony Taylor overturned his initial yellow card decision for a straight red card after a VAR review, and received a four match suspension; Man Utd would go on to draw the match 0–0. Casemiro would be the only player of the 2022–23 Premier League to receive two red cards, and the only Manchester United player to receive a red card for that season.

On 20 September 2023, Casemiro scored a brace in a 4–3 defeat against Bayern Munich on his 100th appearance in European competitions, in the opening match of the 2023–24 Champions League season.

On 1 September 2024, in a home game against Liverpool, Casemiro made two mistakes in the first half, both of which resulted in opposition goals. He was substituted off at half time and strongly criticised by commentators for his poor performance. On 27 October, he scored his first goal of the 2024–25 season against West Ham as his team lost 2–1 before head coach Erik ten Hag was sacked less than 24 hours after the result.

On 22 January 2026, Manchester United officially announced that Casemiro would depart from the club at the conclusion of the 2025–26 season, following a mutual decision not to renew his contract. Despite the club's decision to move on for financial sustainability, Casemiro remained a key figure in the squad. Following a 3–1 home victory over Aston Villa at Old Trafford, the home supporters demonstrated their appreciation by chanting "One more year, Casemiro", pleading with the midfielder to extend his tenure at the club.

In Casemiro's final season at Manchester United, he scored nine goals, with eight of them being headers. This meant that he tied the record for the most headed goals in a single season for Manchester United.

=== Inter Miami ===
On 22 July 2026, Major League Soccer (MLS) side Inter Miami CF announced that they had signed Casemiro to a contract through the end of the 2027 season. After Casemiro's signing, MLS announced an investigation into potential tampering during the process of signing Casemiro following an allegation. Inter Miami had acquired Casemiro's discovery priority from LA Galaxy, but neither the league nor club specified how Inter Miami had acquired the rights or under what terms. In a statement, MLS said that it was "gathering all relevant information" and would not comment further on the investigation until their review was complete and that Inter Miami and LA Galaxy had reached a settlement for the discovery priority, of which the terms would be released upon the completion of the investigation. He made his debut three days later, starting in a 1–0 away win over CF Montréal. He scored his first goal against CF Montréal on 29 August 2026.

== International career ==
=== Youth teams ===
Casemiro scored one goal in seven appearances for the Brazil under-17 team. He played for the Brazil under-20 team at the 2011 South American U-20 Championship and the 2011 FIFA U-20 World Cup, scoring three goals in 15 appearances in total at this level.

=== Senior team ===
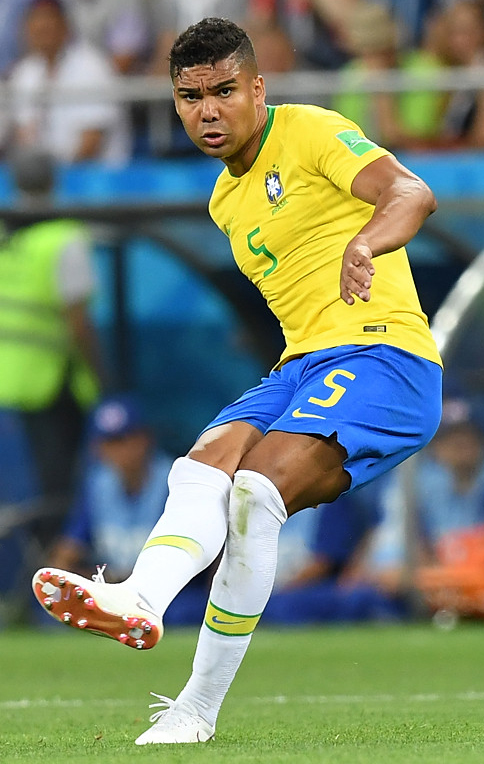
Casemiro playing for Brazil in 2018

Casemiro made his debut for the Brazil senior team on 14 September 2011, in a 0–0 draw against Argentina, aged 19. He was named by manager Dunga in the Brazilian squad for the 2015 Copa América, but did not play any matches in the quarter-final exit in Chile.

On 5 May 2016, Casemiro was named among the 23-man list for the Copa América Centenario to be held in the United States.

In May 2018, Casemiro was selected by manager Tite for the 2018 FIFA World Cup in Russia. He made his debut in the competition on 17 June, playing 60 minutes in a 1–1 group stage draw to Switzerland.

In May 2019, Casemiro was included in Brazil's 23-man squad for the 2019 Copa América on home soil. In the final group game at the Arena Corinthians against Peru, he scored his first international goal to open a 5–0 victory, but was also sent off for two yellow cards and suspended from the next match. He started in Brazil's 3–1 victory over Peru in the 2019 Copa América Final on 7 July, at the Maracanã Stadium.

Casemiro was named to the 2021 Copa América squad on 9 June 2021. In Brazil's third group match on 23 June, he scored the match–winning goal following a Neymar corner in injury time, to help his team defeat Colombia 2–1. On 10 July, he started in his nation's 1–0 defeat to rivals Argentina in the final.

On 7 November 2022, Casemiro was named in the squad for the 2022 World Cup in Qatar. On 28 November, he scored the winning goal in the second group match against Switzerland. Brazil were eliminated by Croatia in the quarter-finals on 9 December, following a 4–2 penalty shoot-out loss after a 1–1 draw following extra-time, although Casemiro was able to net his spot kick.

On 26 May 2025, newly appointed Brazil manager Carlo Ancelotti announced the squad for World Cup qualifiers against Ecuador and Paraguay, including Casemiro, marking the midfielder's return to the national team after a two-year absence. On 18 May 2026, Casemiro was selected for Brazil's squad for the 2026 FIFA World Cup. During the round of 32 match against Japan, Casemiro scored a goal and was named Man of the Match, helping Brazil win 2–1. In addition, he equaled the World Cup record of 12 unbeaten appearances, matching the achievement of Zagallo and Julio Olarticoechea. He also became the second-oldest Brazilian scorer at the World Cup, aged 34 years and 126 days, only behind Bebeto's record in 1998.

== Style of play ==
Casemiro mainly plays as a defensive midfielder, although he has also been deployed in anchor man role in the centre of the pitch, or as a centre-back on occasion. .While Casemiro is mainly known for his ability to provide balance to his teams by supporting his more offensive-minded teammates defensively, and distributing the ball to them accurately after winning back possession, he is also a midfielder, who possesses a powerful shot from outside the penalty area, and reliable distribution, as well as an ability to get forward with his runs off the ball, or start attacks with his passing. These characteristics also enable him to contribute offensively, or even score goals, in addition to breaking up plays. Moreover, his quick reactions, as well as his positional sense, ability to read the game, and good anticipation, enable him to excel in a holding midfield role in front of the defence, by cutting out counter-attacks and shielding the back-line.

Described as a "destroyer" in the media, Casemiro has drawn praise from pundits for his energetic and combative style of play, as well as his tactical awareness and abilities as a ball winner, which enable him to cover ground, track back, and press opponents. His tenacity on the pitch, exemplified by his fierce challenges and stamina, have led Marca to nickname him "The Tank." In addition to his footballing abilities, Casemiro also stands out for his competitive spirit, mentality, consistency, and determination on the pitch. Despite maintaining a good disciplinary record, he has, however, also come into criticism in the media at times over excessively aggressive challenges on the pitch. Casemiro's playing style has drawn comparisons with that of former Real Madrid defensive midfielder Claude Makélélé, as well as compatriot Toninho Cerezo.

== Club ownership ==
On 4 June 2024, it was announced that Casemiro would be investing in Spanish lower-league club Marbella.

== Personal life ==
Since 2011, Casemiro has been in a long-term relationship with Brazilian make-up artist and model Anna Mariana Casemiro (née Bhahm Ortega). They married on 28 June 2014 in Itatiba, São Paulo, and have two children, a daughter and a son.

== Career statistics ==
=== Club ===
As of match played 21 November 2026

Appearances and goals by club, season and competition
Club	Season	League			State league (Note: Includes Campeonato Paulista)		National cup (Note: Includes Copa do Brasil, Copa del Rey, Taça de Portugal, FA Cup)		League cup (Note: Includes Taça da Liga, EFL Cup)		Continental		Other		Total	
Club	Season	Division	Apps	Goals	Apps	Goals	Apps	Goals	Apps	Goals	Apps	Goals	Apps	Goals	Apps	Goals
São Paulo	2010	Série A	18	2	0	0	—		—		0	0	—		18	2
São Paulo	2011	Série A	21	4	12	1	5	1	—		2 (Note: Appearance(s) in Copa Sudamericana)	0	—		40	6
São Paulo	2012	Série A	22	0	18	2	9	1	—		1	0	—		50	3
São Paulo	2013	Série A	—		1	0	—		—		2 (Note: Appearances in Copa Libertadores)	0	—		3	0
São Paulo	Total		61	6	31	3	14	2	—		5	0	—		111	11
Real Madrid Castilla (loan)	2012–13	Segunda División	15	1	—		—		—		—		—		15	1
Real Madrid (loan)	2012–13	La Liga	1	0	—		0	0	—		0	0	—		1	0
Real Madrid	2013–14	La Liga	12	0	—		7	0	—		6 (Note: Appearances in UEFA Champions League)	0	—		25	0
Real Madrid	2015–16	La Liga	23	1	—		1	0	—		11	0	—		35	1
Real Madrid	2016–17	La Liga	25	4	—		5	0	—		9	2	3 (Note: One appearance in UEFA Super Cup, two appearances in FIFA Club World Cup)	0	42	6
Real Madrid	2017–18	La Liga	30	5	—		1	0	—		12	1	5 (Note: One appearance and one goal in UEFA Super Cup, two appearances in Supercopa de España, two appearances in FIFA Club World Cup)	1	48	7
Real Madrid	2018–19	La Liga	29	3	—		5	0	—		6	1	3	0	43	4
Real Madrid	2019–20	La Liga	35	4	—		1	0	—		8	1	2 (Note: Appearance(s) in Supercopa de España)	0	46	5
Real Madrid	2020–21	La Liga	34	6	—		1	0	—		10	1	1	0	46	7
Real Madrid	2021–22	La Liga	32	1	—		3	0	—		11	0	2	0	48	1
Real Madrid	2022–23	La Liga	1	0	—		—		—		—		1 (Note: Appearance in UEFA Super Cup)	0	2	0
Real Madrid	Real Madrid total		222	24	—		24	0	—		73	6	17	1	336	31
Porto (loan)	2014–15	Primeira Liga	28	3	—		1	0	2	0	10	1	—		41	4
Manchester United	2022–23	Premier League	28	4	—		5	2	6	1	12 (Note: Appearances in UEFA Europa League)	0	—		51	7
Manchester United	2023–24	Premier League	25	1	—		3	1	2	1	2	2	—		32	5
Manchester United	2024–25	Premier League	24	1	—		2	0	2	2	13	2	1 (Note: Appearance in FA Community Shield)	0	42	5
Manchester United	2025–26	Premier League	34	9	—		1	0	0	0	—		—		35	9
Manchester United	Total		111	15	—		11	3	10	4	27	4	1	0	160	26
Inter Miami	2026	MLS	18	3	—		—		—		—		5 (Note: Three appearances in Leagues Cup, one appearance and one goal in Campeones Cup, one appearance in MLS Cup playoffs)	1	23	4
Career total			455	52	31	3	50	5	12	4	115	11	23	2	686	77

=== International ===
As of match played 5 July 2026

Appearances and goals by national team and year
National team	Year	Apps	Goals
Brazil	2011	1	0
Brazil	2012	4	0
Brazil	2013	0	0
Brazil	2014	2	0
Brazil	2015	2	0
Brazil	2016	4	0
Brazil	2017	7	0
Brazil	2018	12	0
Brazil	2019	14	3
Brazil	2020	2	0
Brazil	2021	11	1
Brazil	2022	10	2
Brazil	2023	6	1
Brazil	2024	0	0
Brazil	2025	7	1
Brazil	2026	9	2
Total		91	10

As of match played 5 July 2026
Scores and results list Brazil's goal tally first, score column indicates score after each Casemiro goal

List of international goals scored by Casemiro
No.	Date	Venue	Cap	Opponent	Score	Result	Competition	Ref.
1	22 June 2019	Arena Corinthians, São Paulo, Brazil	39	Peru	1–0	5–0	2019 Copa América	
2	6 September 2019	Hard Rock Stadium, Miami Gardens, United States	42	Colombia	1–0	2–2	Friendly	
3	13 October 2019	National Stadium, Singapore	45	Nigeria	1–1	1–1	Friendly	
4	23 June 2021	Estádio Olímpico Nilton Santos, Rio de Janeiro, Brazil	52	Colombia	2–1	2–1	2021 Copa América	
5	27 January 2022	Estadio Rodrigo Paz Delgado, Quito, Ecuador	60	Ecuador	1–0	1–1	2022 FIFA World Cup qualification	
6	28 November 2022	Stadium 974, Doha, Qatar	67	Switzerland	1–0	1–0	2022 FIFA World Cup	
7	25 March 2023	Ibn Batouta Stadium, Tangier, Morocco	70	Morocco	1–1	1–2	Friendly	
8	15 November 2025	Emirates Stadium, London, England	81	Senegal	2–0	2–0	Friendly	
9	31 May 2026	Estádio do Maracanã, Rio de Janeiro, Brazil	85	Panama	2–1	6–2	Friendly	
10	29 June 2026	NRG Stadium, Houston, United States	90	Japan	1–1	2–1	2026 FIFA World Cup	

== Honours ==
São Paulo U20

- Copa São Paulo de Futebol Júnior: 2010

São Paulo

- Copa Sudamericana: 2012

Real Madrid

- La Liga: 2016–17, 2019–20, 2021–22
- Copa del Rey: 2013–14
- Supercopa de España: 2017, 2020, 2022
- UEFA Champions League: 2013–14, 2015–16, 2016–17, 2017–18, 2021–22
- UEFA Super Cup: 2016, 2017, 2022
- FIFA Club World Cup: 2016, 2017, 2018

Manchester United

- EFL Cup: 2022–23
- FA Cup: 2023–24; runner-up: 2022–23
- UEFA Europa League runner-up: 2024–25

Inter Miami

- Campeones Cup: 2026

Brazil U17

- South American U-17 Championship: 2009

Brazil U20

- FIFA U-20 World Cup: 2011
- South American U-20 Championship: 2011

Brazil

- Copa América: 2019

Individual

- UEFA Champions League Squad of the Season: 2016–17, 2017–18
- UEFA La Liga Team of the Season: 2019–20
- Copa América Team of the Tournament: 2021
- Trofeo EFE: 2019–20
- IFFHS Team of the Copa América: 2021
- IFFHS CONMEBOL Team of the Year: 2020, 2021 (substitute), 2022
- Alan Hardaker Trophy: 2023
- FIFPRO Men's World 11: 2022
- UEFA Europa League Team of the Season: 2024–25
- IFFHS CONMEBOL Team of the Decade: 2011–2020
