= Alexander Shaw (soccer, born 2008) =

American soccer player (born 2008)

Personal information
- Date of birth: 3 April 2008 (age 18)
- Place of birth: Orlando, Florida, United States
- Height: 1.80 m (5 ft 11 in)
- Position: Midfielder

Team information
- Current team: Inter Miami
- Number: 88

Youth career
- Inter Miami

Senior career*
Years	Team	Apps	(Gls)
2025–	Inter Miami II	15	(0)
2026–	Inter Miami	6	(1)

International career^{‡}
2026	United States U18	3	(1)
2026–	United States U19	2	(0)
2026–	United States U20	3	(1)
- * Club domestic league appearances and goals ‡ National team caps and goals as of 2 October 2026

Alexander Shaw (born 3 April 2008) is an American professional soccer player who plays as a midfielder or winger for Inter Miami.

== Early life ==
Shaw was born on 3 April 2008 in Orlando, Florida, United States. Born to a Colombian mother and an American father, he obtained Colombian citizenship and American citizenship.

== Club career ==
As a youth player, Shaw joined the youth academy of Inter Miami, where he captained the club's under-17 team.

Ahead of the 2026 season, he was promoted to their senior team. On 14 March 2026, he debuted for the Herons during a 0–0 away draw with Charlotte FC in the league.

== International career ==
Shaw is a United States youth international and has represented the country internationally at under-18, under-19 and under-20 level and is eligible to represent Colombia internationally through his mother. Altogether, he made three appearances and scored one goal while playing for the United States men's national under-18 soccer team.

On 29 September 2026, he debuted for the United States men's national under-19 soccer team during a 2–0 away friendly win over the Wales national under-19 football team. During the summer of 2026, he played for the United States men's national under-20 soccer team during the 2026 CONCACAF U-20 Championship.

== Style of play ==
Shaw plays as a midfielder. Spanish newspaper Marca wrote in 2026 that he "primarily operates as a defensive midfielder, a role that demands tactical awareness, ball-winning ability, and composure under pressure – qualities... [he] has displayed".
