= Ian Fray =

Jamaican footballer (born 2002)

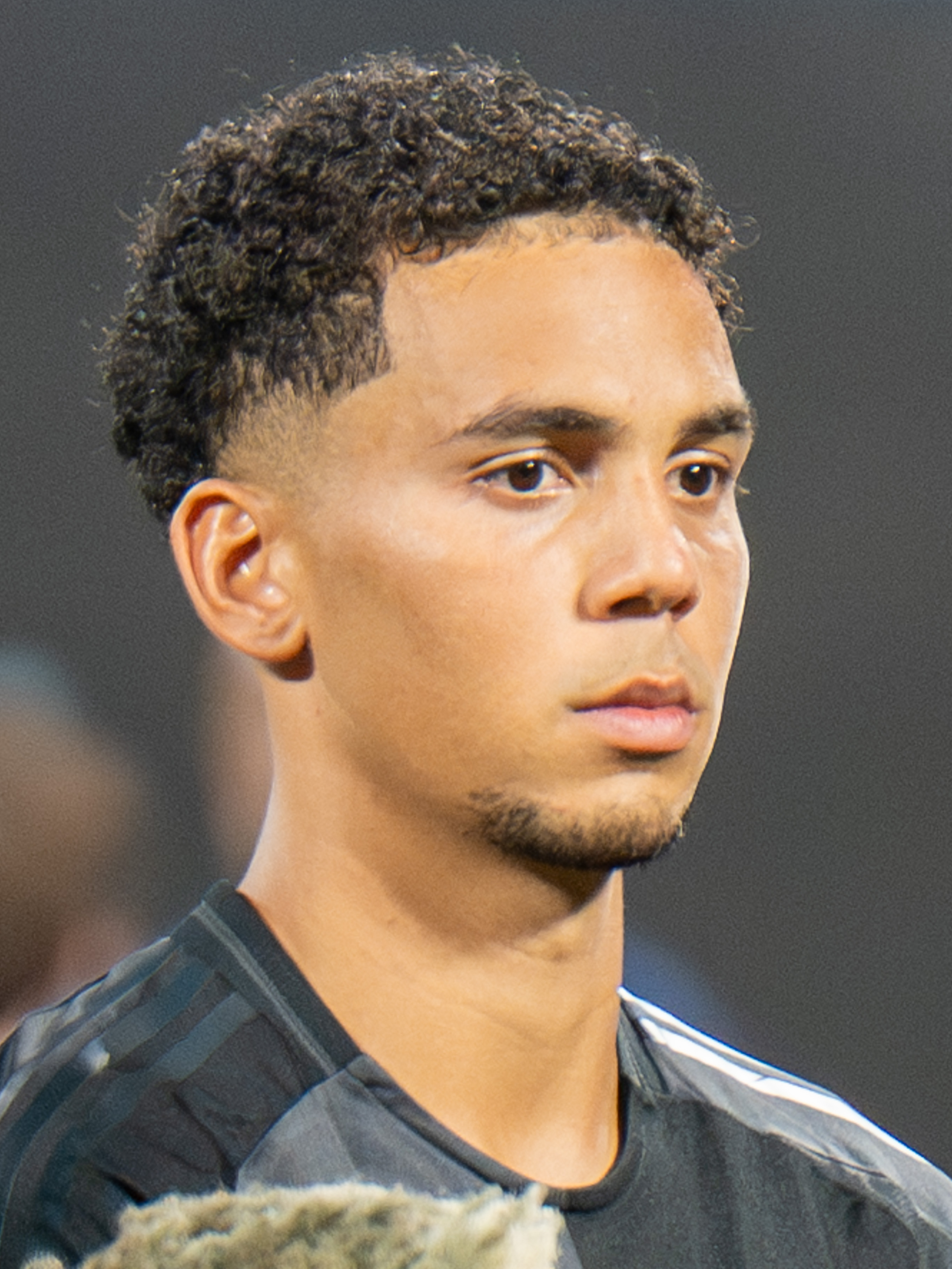
- Fray with Inter Miami in 2025

Personal information
- Full name: Ian Charles Michael Fray
- Date of birth: August 31, 2002 (age 24)
- Place of birth: Coconut Creek, Florida, U.S.
- Height: 6 ft 0 in (1.83 m)
- Position: Defender

Team information
- Current team: Inter Miami
- Number: 17

Youth career
- 2016–2017: Weston FC
- 2017–2019: Miramar United
- 2019–2020: Inter Miami

Senior career*
Years	Team	Apps	(Gls)
2020–	Inter Miami II	14	(1)
2021–	Inter Miami	49	(4)

International career^{‡}
2025–	Jamaica	4	(0)
- * Club domestic league appearances and goals as of March 21, 2026 ‡ National team caps and goals as of March 31, 2026

Ian Charles Michael Fray (born August 31, 2002) is a professional footballer who plays as a defender for Major League Soccer club Inter Miami. Born in the United States, he represents the Jamaica national team.

== Club career ==
=== Fort Lauderdale CF ===
Fray made his league debut for the club on July 18, 2020, coming on as a 63rd-minute substitute for Modesto Méndez in a 2–0 defeat to the Greenville Triumph.

=== Inter Miami ===
==== Before first match ====
On January 26, 2021, Fray signed as a homegrown player with Inter Miami. Fray suffered a torn ACL one month into his professional career. During the 2022 pre-season, Fray suffered another ACL tear, bringing his second season with the senior team to a premature end.

==== 2023 season ====
As a result, Fray made his competitive debut for the club over two years after signing his homegrown contract, coming on as a 66th-minute substitute for Ryan Sailor in a 2–1 defeat to Nashville on May 17, 2023. In June, he scored his first professional goal, netting late in a 2–1 defeat to D.C. United. However, Fray's 2023 season would also be cut short, as he suffered a third ACL injury in the club's opening match of the 2023 Leagues Cup. Ian Fray later won the 2023 Leagues Cup with Inter Miami, only playing the already mentioned match where he got injured, where he played 30 minutes. Fray played 2 matches in the 2023 U.S. Open Cup, including his second ever Inter Miami match, against Nashville.

==== 2024 season ====
On October 26, 2024, Fray suffered an injury to his right medial meniscus that ruled him out until early 2025.

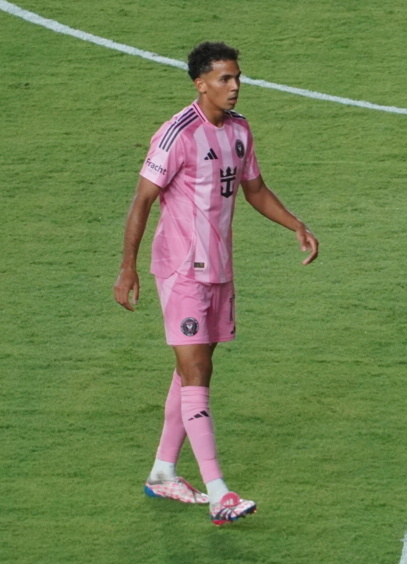
Fray with Inter Miami in 2025.

== International career ==
Fray was born to a Jamaican father and American mother, and holds dual American and Jamaican citizenship. He is eligible for both the United States and Jamaica. In June 2023, Fray was named to Jamaica's 50-man provisional squad for the 2023 CONCACAF Gold Cup.

Fray made his full international debut for Jamaica in October 2025 in World Cup Qualifiers versus Curaçao and Bermuda.

== Personal life ==
Fray's sister, Marlee Fray, represents the Jamaica women's national football team.

== Career statistics ==
=== Club ===
As of match played March 21, 2026

Appearances and goals by club, season and competition
Club	Season	League			National cup		Continental		Other (Note: Includes MLS Cup playoffs, Leagues Cup)		Total	
Club	Season	Division	Apps	Goals	Apps	Goals	Apps	Goals	Apps	Goals	Apps	Goals
Inter Miami II	2020	USL League One	9	0	—		—		—		9	0
Inter Miami II	2023	MLS Next Pro	1	0	—		—		—		1	0
Inter Miami II	2024	MLS Next Pro	4	1	—		—		—		4	1
Inter Miami II	Total		14	1	—		—		—		14	1
Inter Miami	2023	MLS	11	1	2	0	—		1	0	14	1
Inter Miami	2024	MLS	14	2	—		—		3	0	17	2
Inter Miami	2025	MLS	21	1	—		—		8 (Note: Two appearances in FIFA Club World Cup, four appearances in Leagues Cup, two appearances in MLS Cup Playoffs)	0	29	1
Inter Miami	2026	MLS	3	0	—		1 (Note: Appearance in CONCACAF Champions Cup)	0	0	0	4	0
Inter Miami	Total		49	4	2	0	1	0	12	0	64	4
Career total			63	5	2	0	1	0	12	0	78	5

=== International ===
As of match played 31 March 2026

Appearances and goals by national team and year
National team	Year	Apps	Goals
Jamaica	2025	3	0
Jamaica	2026	1	0
Total		4	0

== Honors ==
Inter Miami

- MLS Cup: 2025
- Eastern Conference (MLS): 2025
- Leagues Cup: 2023
- Supporters' Shield: 2024
