= Noah Allen =

Greek footballer (born 2004)

Noah Allen Νόα Άλεν
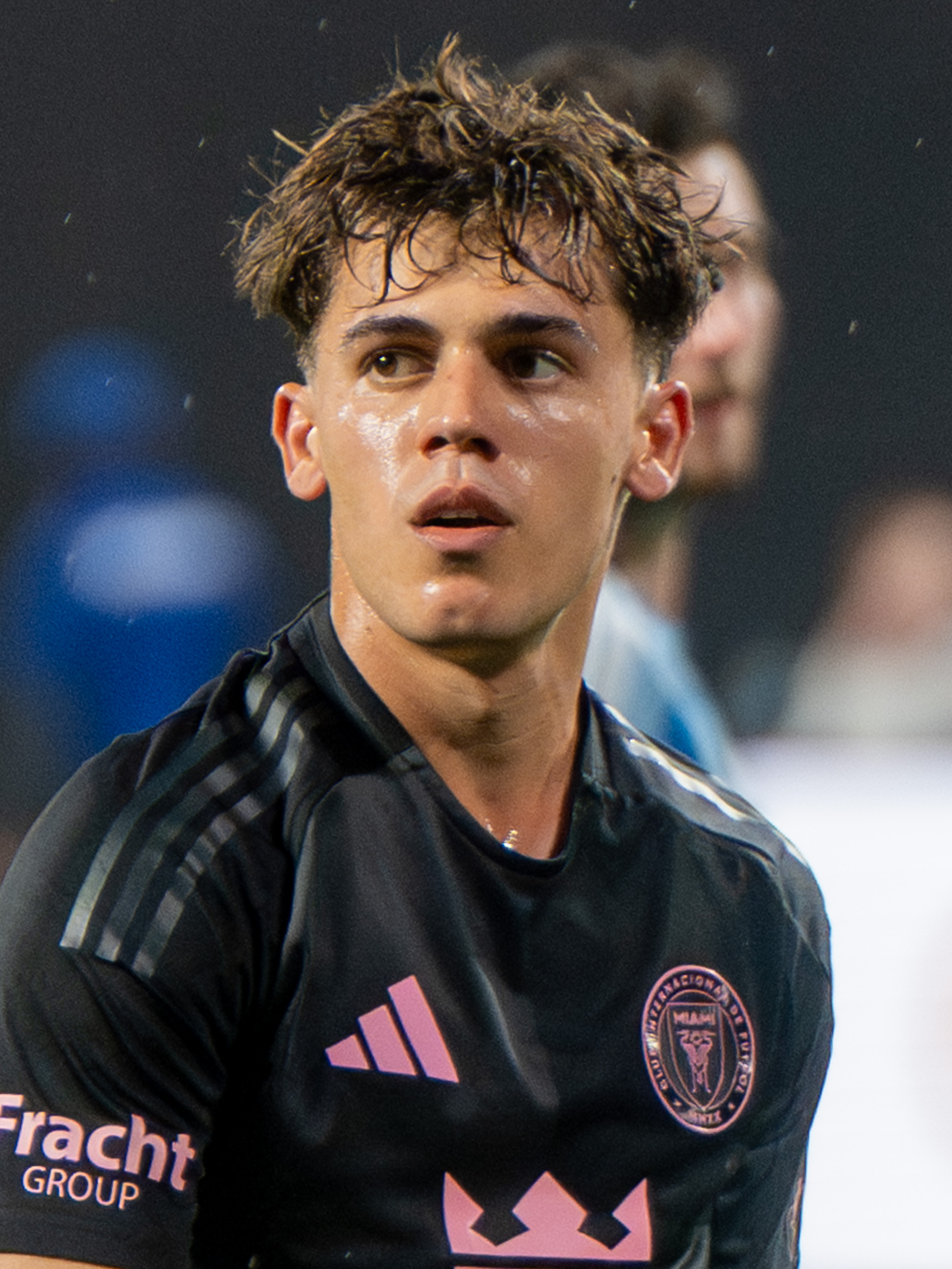
- Allen with Inter Miami in 2025

Personal information
- Full name: Noah James Allen
- Date of birth: 28 April 2004 (age 22)
- Place of birth: Pembroke Pines, Florida, U.S.
- Height: 1.75 m (5 ft 9 in)
- Position: Defender

Team information
- Current team: Chicago Fire (on loan from Inter Miami)
- Number: 32

Youth career
- Weston FC
- 2019–2022: Inter Miami

Senior career*
| Years | Team | Apps | (Gls) |
| 2020–2024 | Inter Miami II | 53 | (0) |
| 2022– | Inter Miami | 89 | (2) |
| 2026– | → Chicago Fire (loan) | 11 | (0) |

International career^{‡}
| 2022 | United States U20 | 5 | (1) |
| 2025– | Greece U21 | 9 | (1) |
Medal record
Men's football
Representing United States
CONCACAF U-20 Championship
| Winner | 2022 Honduras |
- * Club domestic league appearances and goals as of 17 November 2026 ‡ National team caps and goals as of 26 September 2026

Noah James Allen (Greek: Νόα Τζέιμς Άλεν, romanized: Noa Tzeims Alen; born 28 April 2004) is a professional footballer who plays as a defender for Major League Soccer club Chicago Fire FC, on loan from club Inter Miami. Born in the United States, he represents Greece at youth level.

== Club career ==
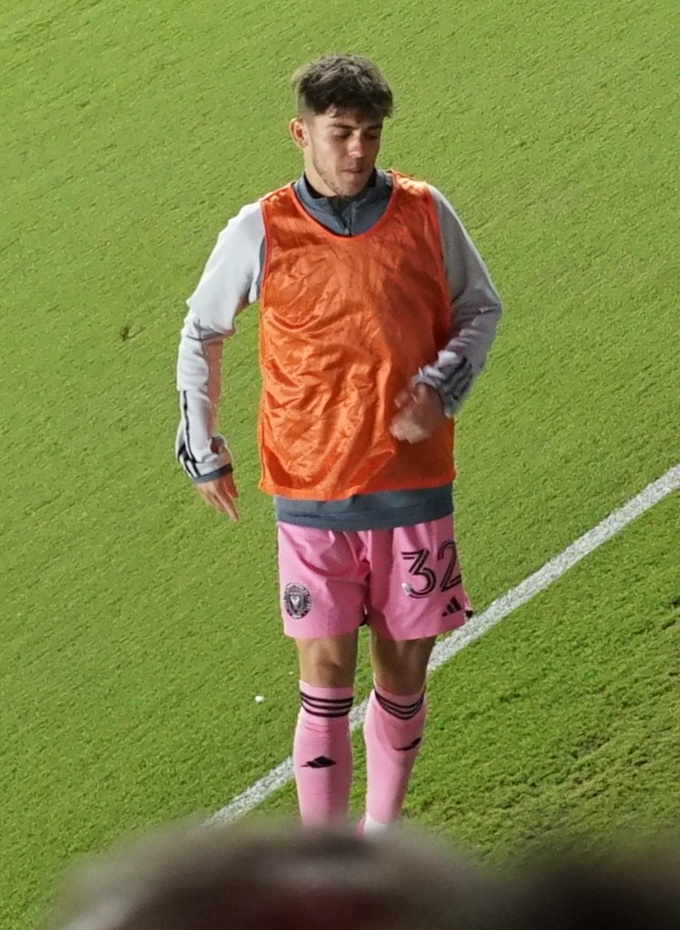
Allen warming up for Inter Miami in 2024.

Born in Pembroke Pines, Florida, Allen began his career with Weston FC before joining the academy of Inter Miami in 2019. He made his debut for Inter Miami's reserve side, Inter Miami CF II, on 3 October 2020, against North Texas SC. Allen started and played 67 minutes as Fort Lauderdale were defeated 0–3.

Allen made his Inter Miami CF debut on 26 February 2022, against Chicago Fire FC. On 11 March 2022, Allen signed a homegrown player contract with Inter Miami CF. On 18 September 2025, Allen extended his contract with Inter Miami until 2028, with a club option for an additional year.

== International career ==
In January 2022, Allen was named to a training camp roster for the United States national under-20 team.

On 3 March 2025, Allen's request to switch international allegiance to Greece was approved by FIFA.

== Personal life ==
Allen was born in the United States to an American father and Greek mother. He holds dual-citizenship, and received his Greek passport in 2022. His maternal grandfather was born in Valtero, Serres.

== Career statistics ==
=== Club ===
As of match played 6 April 2026

Appearances and goals by club, season and competition
| Club | Season | League | League | | Playoffs | | National cup | | Continental | | Other | | Total | |
| Club | Season | League | Apps | Goals | Apps | Goals | Apps | Goals | Apps | Goals | Apps | Goals | Apps | Goals |
|---|---|---|---|---|---|---|---|---|---|---|---|---|---|---|
| Fort Lauderdale CF | 2020 | USL League One | 2 | 0 | — | | — | | — | | — | | 2 | 0 |
| Fort Lauderdale CF | 2021 | USL League One | 27 | 0 | — | | — | | — | | — | | 27 | 0 |
| Inter Miami II | 2022 | MLS Next Pro | 15 | 0 | — | | — | | — | | — | | 15 | 0 |
| Inter Miami II | 2023 | MLS Next Pro | 5 | 0 | — | | — | | — | | — | | 5 | 0 |
| Inter Miami II | 2024 | MLS Next Pro | 4 | 0 | — | | — | | — | | — | | 4 | 0 |
| Inter Miami II | Total | | 53 | 0 | 0 | 0 | 0 | 0 | 0 | 0 | 0 | 0 | 53 | 0 |
| Inter Miami | 2022 | MLS | 8 | 0 | — | | 2 | 0 | — | | — | | 10 | 0 |
| Inter Miami | 2023 | MLS | 19 | 1 | — | | 2 | 0 | — | | 5 (Note: Appearances in Leagues Cup) | 0 | 26 | 1 |
| Inter Miami | 2024 | MLS | 17 | 0 | 2 | 0 | — | | 3 (Note: Appearances in CONCACAF Champions Cup) | 0 | 3 | 0 | 25 | 0 |
| Inter Miami | 2025 | MLS | 26 | 0 | 6 | 0 | — | | 8 | 1 | 7 | 0 | 47 | 1 |
| Inter Miami | 2026 | MLS | 6 | 1 | — | | — | | 2 | 0 | 0 | 0 | 6 | 0 |
| Inter Miami | Total | | 76 | 2 | 8 | 0 | 4 | 0 | 13 | 0 | 15 | 0 | 116 | 2 |
| Career total | | | 129 | 2 | 8 | 0 | 4 | 0 | 13 | 0 | 15 | 0 | 169 | 2 |

== Honours ==
Inter Miami

- MLS Cup: 2025
- Eastern Conference (MLS): 2025
- Leagues Cup: 2023
- Supporters' Shield: 2024

United States U20

- CONCACAF U-20 Championship: 2022

Individual

- CONCACAF Champions Cup Best Young Player: 2025
