= Yannick Bright =

Italian footballer (born 2001)

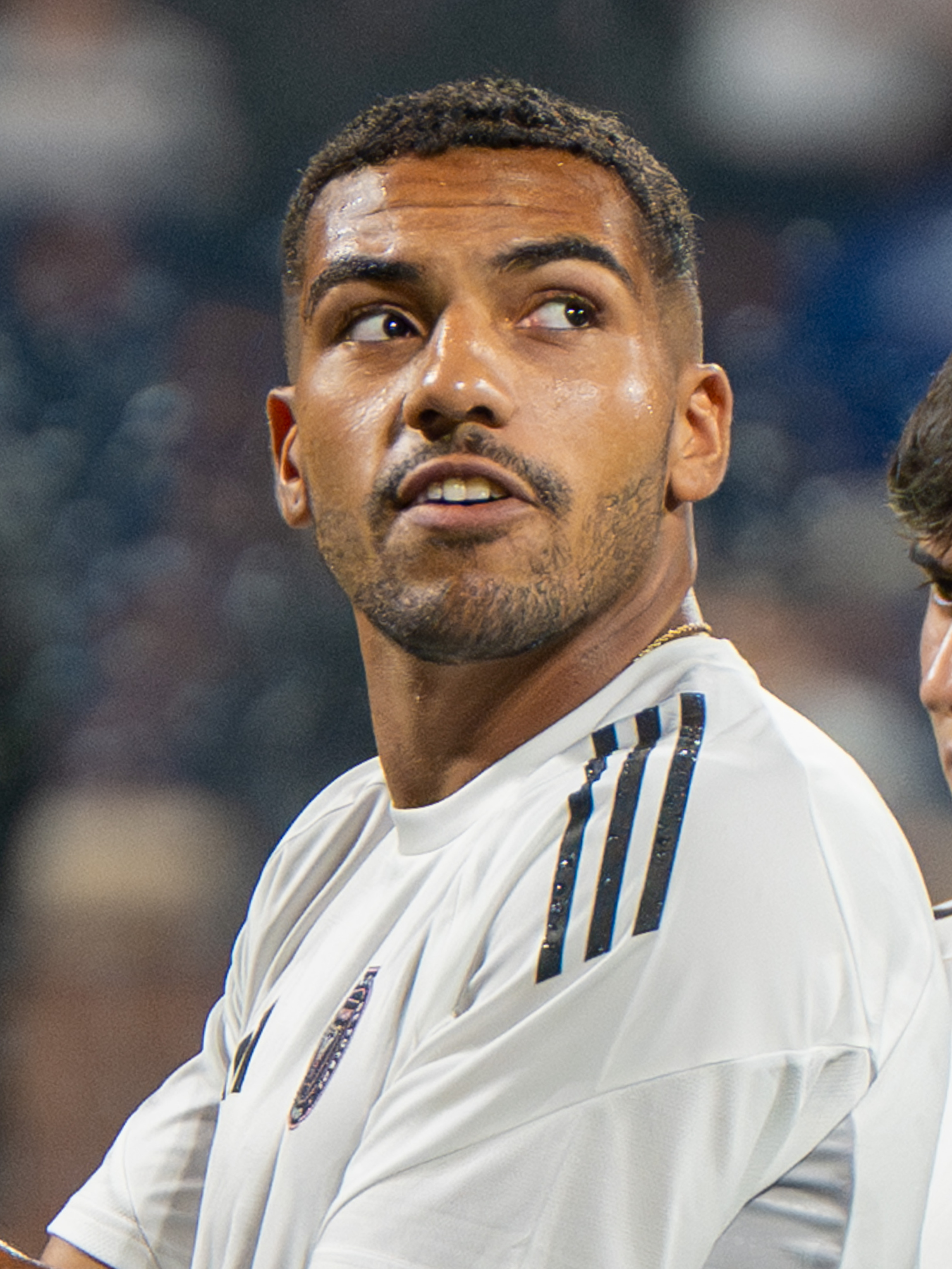
- Bright with Inter Miami in 2025

Personal information
- Full name: Yannick Bright
- Date of birth: 3 September 2001 (age 25)
- Place of birth: Milan, Italy
- Height: 1.80 m (5 ft 11 in)
- Position: Midfielder

Team information
- Current team: Inter Miami CF
- Number: 42

Youth career
- Alcione
- 2016–2018: US Seguro
- 2018–2019: Arconatese

College career
Years	Team	Apps	(Gls)
2020–2023	New Hampshire Wildcats	69	(3)

Senior career*
Years	Team	Apps	(Gls)
2019–2020	Arconatese	20	(0)
2022	North Carolina Fusion U23	5	(0)
2024–	Inter Miami CF	49	(1)
2024–	→ Inter Miami CF II (loan)	2	(1)
- * Club domestic league appearances and goals as of September 30, 2025

Yannick Bright (born 3 September 2001) is an Italian professional footballer who plays as a midfielder for Major League Soccer club Inter Miami CF.

== Early life ==
Bright was born in Milan, Italy to an Ivorian father and Italian mother. He played youth football with Alcione and later Seguro. Afterwards, he joined the youth team of Arconatese.

== College career ==
In 2020, he chose to head to the United States to play college soccer. In the fall of 2020, he began attending the University of New Hampshire, where he played for the men's soccer team. In April 2020, he scored his first collegiate goal in a victory over the UMass Lowell River Hawks, which earned him America East Conference Rookie of the Week honours. At the end of his first season, he was named to the America East All-Rookie Team, the America East All-Tournament Team, the America East Academic Honor Roll, and was named the team's Most Valuable Player.

At the end of his sophomore season, he was again named the team's MVP, and was also named the America East Midfielder of the Year, named to the All-America East First Team, All-Northeast Region First Team, the First Team All-America, and the America East Commissioner's Honor Roll. He was also named the New England Soccer Journal Division I Player of the Year and a MAC Hermann Trophy Semifinalist.

In 2022, he was again named the America East Midfielder of the Year, and was named to the All-America East First Team, the All-ECAC First Team, the All-Northeast region First Team, and a Third Team All-American. He was also named the America East Men's Soccer Scholar Athlete of the Year, and named to the America East All-Academic Team, Academic All-District, National College Athlete Honor Society, and the America East Commissioner's Honor Roll. He was also invited to participate in the MLS College Showcase.

Ahead of his senior season, he was named to the MAC Hermann Trophy Watch List and the NCAA Division I Men's Players to Watch List. After the season, he was again named the America East Midfielder of the Year, named to the All-America East First team and a First Team All-American. He was also named the America East Men’s Soccer Scholar Athlete of the Year for the second straight year and was named to the America East All-Academic Team, the Academic All-District Team, and was named a MAC Hermann Trophy Semifinalist. He was also invited once again to attend the MLS College Showcase.

== Club career ==
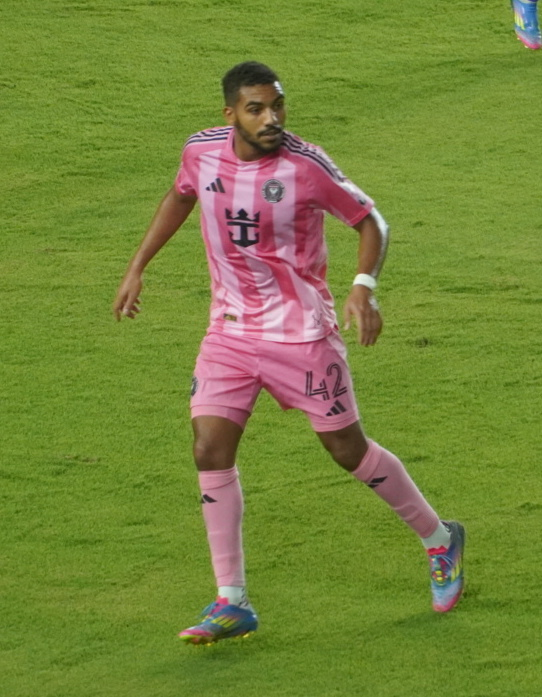
Bright with Inter Miami in 2025

In 2019, he began playing with Arconatese in the Serie D. He played 20 matches for the club, before departing in 2020.

In 2022, Bright played with the North Carolina Fusion U23 in USL League Two.

At the 2024 MLS SuperDraft, Bright was selected in the first round (15th overall) by Inter Miami. He then joined the club for their pre-season camp. In March 2024, he signed a one-year contract with the club with club options from 2025 to 2027. He made his Major League Soccer debut on 23 March that same year.

== Career statistics ==
As of 18 May 2024

Club	Season	League			Playoffs		Domestic Cup		Continental		Other		Total	
Club	Season	Division	Apps	Goals	Apps	Goals	Apps	Goals	Apps	Goals	Apps	Goals	Apps	Goals
Arconatese	2018–19	Serie D	3	0	–		–		–		–		3	0
Arconatese	2019–20	Serie D	17	0	–		–		–		–		17	0
Arconatese	Total		20	0	0	0	0	0	0	0	0	0	20	0
North Carolina Fusion U23	2022	USL League Two	5	0	1	0	–		–		–		6	0
Inter Miami CF	2024	Major League Soccer	6	0	0	0	–		0	0	0	0	6	0
Inter Miami CF II (loan)	2024	MLS Next Pro	2	1	0	0	0	0	–		–		2	1
Career total			33	1	1	0	0	0	0	0	0	0	34	1

== Honours ==
Inter Miami

- MLS Cup: 2025
- Eastern Conference (MLS): 2025
- Supporters' Shield: 2024
- Campeones Cup: 2026

Individual

- MLS All-Star: 2026
