= 2026 Campeones Cup =

Soccer match in Miami

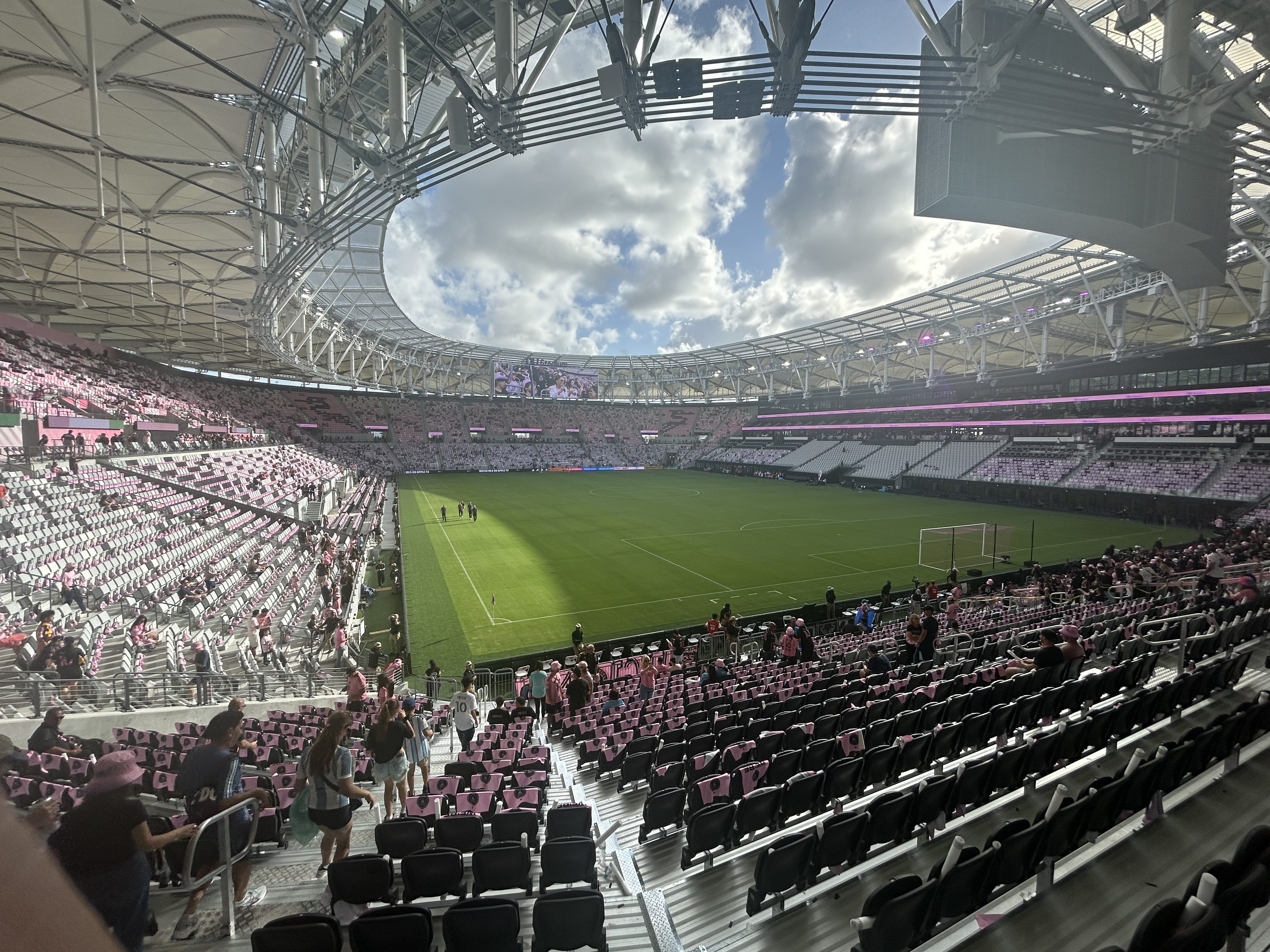
- Nu Stadium in Miami, Florida hosted the match
- Event: Campeones Cup
Inter Miami CF	Cruz Azul
(United States Soccer Federation)	(Mexican Football Federation)
2	0
- Date: September 16, 2026
- Venue: Nu Stadium, Miami, Florida
- Man of the Match: Lionel Messi (Inter Miami CF)
- Referee: Keylor Herrera (Costa Rica)
- Attendance: 26,495

The 2026 Campeones Cup was the eighth edition of the Campeones Cup, an annual North American soccer match contested between the reigning champion of Major League Soccer (MLS) and the winner of the Campeón de Campeones of Liga MX.

The match was contested between Inter Miami CF, winners of the 2025 MLS Cup, and Cruz Azul, winners of the 2026 Campeón de Campeones. Inter Miami hosted the match on September 16, 2026, at Nu Stadium in Miami, Florida, United States. Inter Miami won the match 2–0 with goals from Lionel Messi and Casemiro to claim their first Campeones Cup title.

== Background ==
The match featured Inter Miami, winners of the 2025 MLS Cup, and Cruz Azul, winners of the 2026 Campeón de Campeones. Inter Miami hosted the match on September 16, 2026, at Nu Stadium in Miami, Florida, United States. The last time these two teams played against each other was in the group stage of the 2023 Leagues Cup, when Inter Miami won 2–1 via a stoppage time goal from Lionel Messi in his debut with the team.

== Match ==
=== Details ===
September 16, 2026
8:00 p.m. EDT (UTC−4)

Inter Miami CF (United States Soccer Federation)	2–0	(Mexican Football Federation) Cruz Azul
Messi 24'; Casemiro 81'	Report

Nu Stadium, Miami, Florida
Attendance: 26,495
Referee: Keylor Herrera (Costa Rica)
