= Nu Stadium =

Soccer stadium in Miami, Florida, United States

- The House that Messi Built

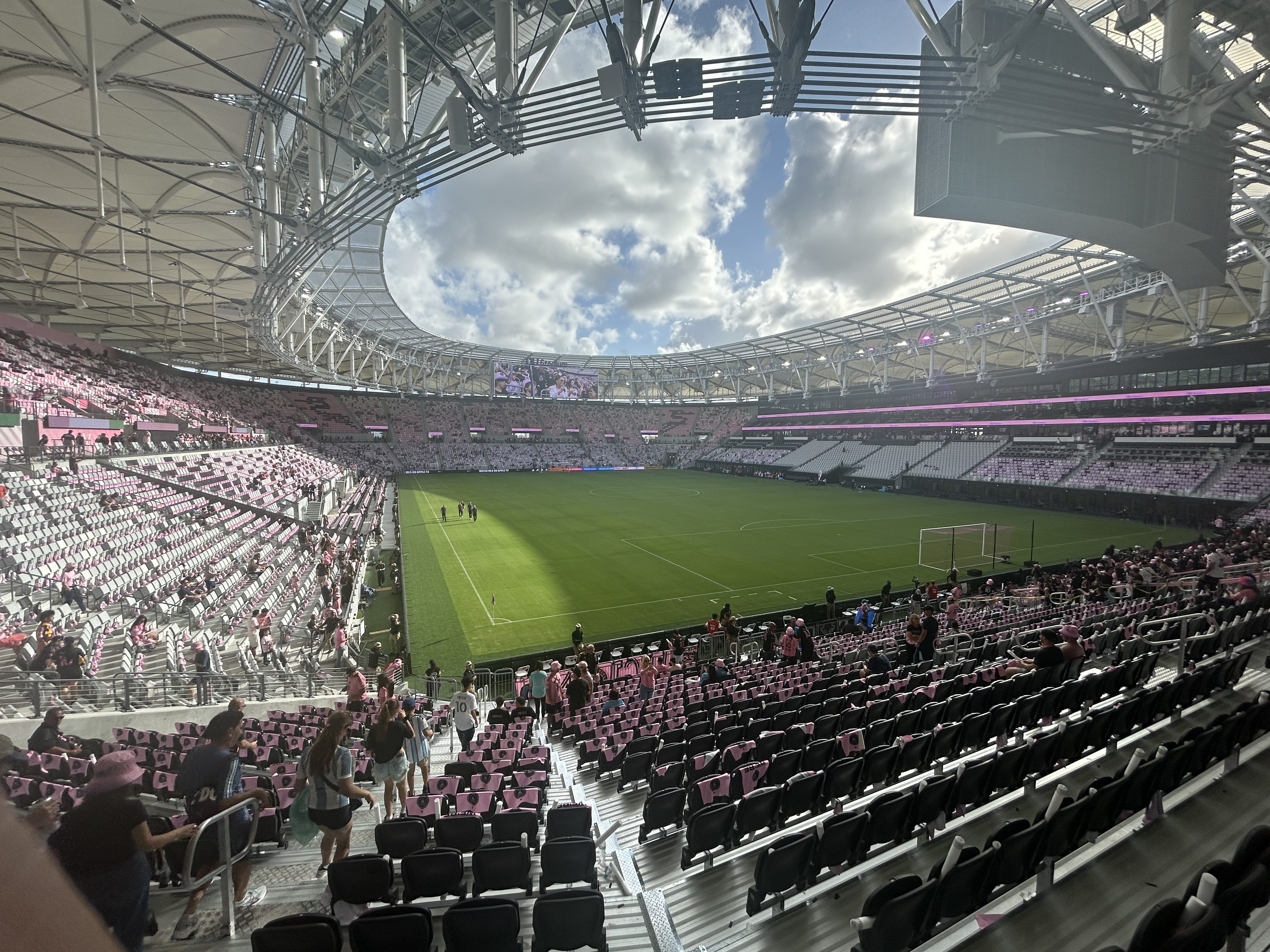
- The stadium on its opening day in April 2026

- Location in Miami Location in Florida Location in the United States
- Address: 1900 NW 37th Avenue
- Location: Miami Freedom Park; Miami, Florida, U.S.
- Coordinates: 25.7931°N 80.2590°W
- Owner: Inter Miami
- Operator: Inter Miami
- Capacity: 26,700
- Type: Soccer-specific stadium
- Surface: Grass
- Public transit: Tri-Rail; Miami Metrorail; MIA Mover at Miami Intermodal Center

Construction
- Groundbreaking: August 28, 2023
- Opened: April 4, 2026
- Architects: MANICA Architecture; Arquitectonica

Tenant
- Inter Miami (MLS) (2026–present)

Website
- nustadium.com

Nu Stadium is a soccer-specific stadium in Miami, Florida, United States. Opened in April 2026, the 26,700-seat stadium is the home field of Inter Miami of Major League Soccer (MLS), replacing the interim Chase Stadium in Fort Lauderdale.

Following a long process in which numerous locations were considered, the stadium was unveiled by team co-founder David Beckham in 2018, and approved by Miami City Council in 2022. It is the centerpiece of Miami Freedom Park—a mixed-use development near Miami International Airport that will include office, retail, and commercial space, as well as public parks.

== History ==
=== Location planning ===
==== PortMiami (2014) ====
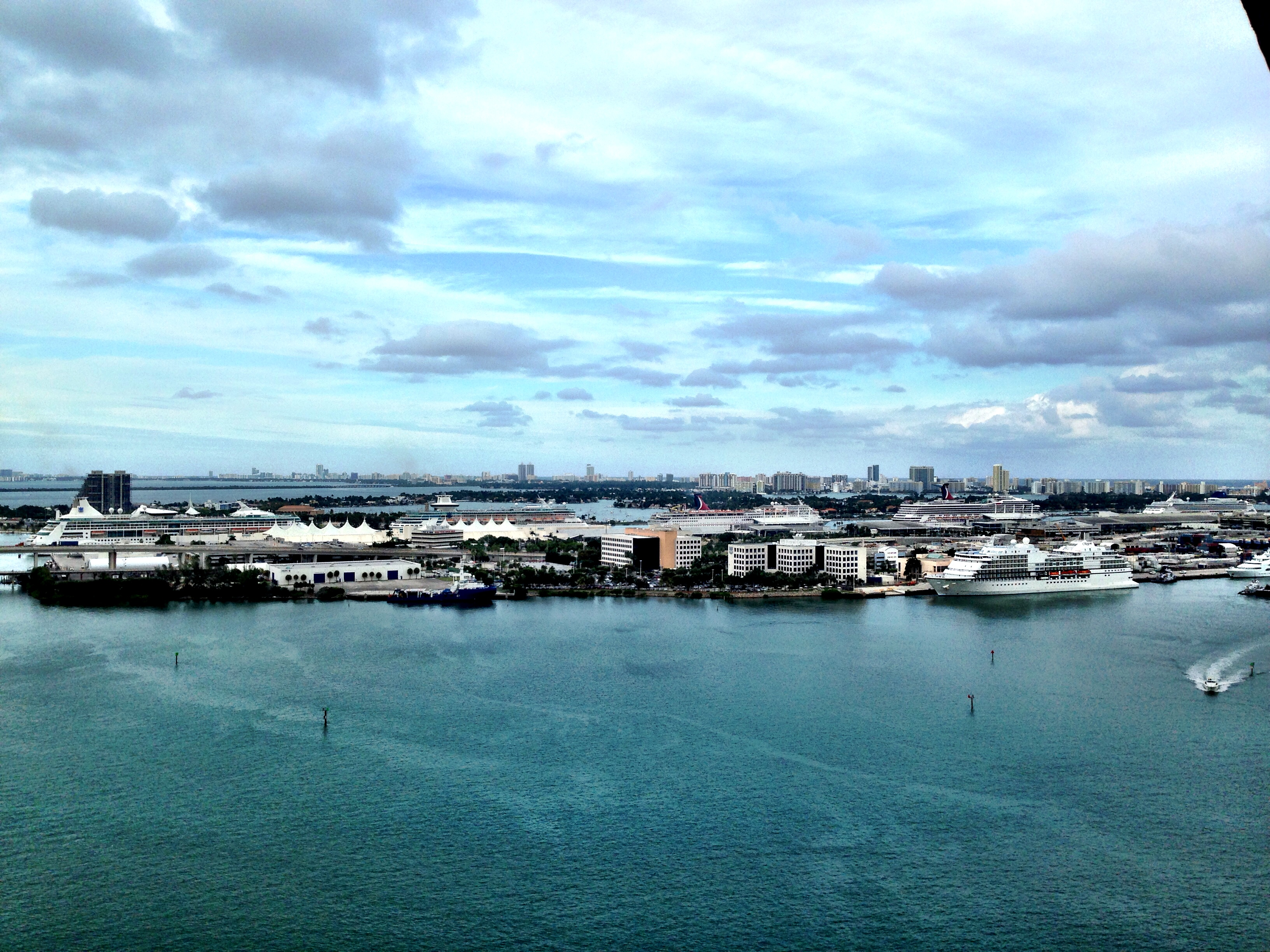
The initial proposal put the stadium at the southwest corner of Dodge Island.

On March 25, 2014, David Beckham announced plans to build a 25,000-seat stadium at PortMiami, adjacent to the Miami Heat's American Airlines Arena in the Downtown area of the city, with an intent for it to serve as the home stadium for his proposed Major League Soccer expansion club. Under the proposal, the stadium would have been located at the southwest corner of Dodge Island and be accessible by a pedestrian bridge from Biscayne Boulevard and the American Airlines Arena.

On April 8, 2014, Miami-Dade commissioners refused to let PortMiami relocate a fuel-spill facility that would have needed to move in order to accommodate the stadium and entertainment complex. The stadium plan called for a commercial complex where the facility is located. Royal Caribbean Cruises, who had previously proposed developing on the same site, formed the Miami Seaport Alliance (MSA), a coalition of companies and unions based in the port, and led the opposition to the stadium plan. Political strategist Joe Slade White created an advertising campaign for MSA, which later won a national award for best public affairs advertising, claiming that a stadium would worsen traffic problems and interfere with the port's plans to expand and handle increased cargo. Beckham's real estate adviser argued that Royal Caribbean opposed the stadium plan because it paid below-market rates on its lease at the port.

Facing political pressure, Beckham's group announced that the PortMiami site had become "Plan B", and Miami-Dade County commissioners voted 11–1 against building the stadium at PortMiami on May 20, 2014.

On February 3, 2015, in a move that was described as symbolic, county commissioners voted unanimously to recommend FIU Stadium as a temporary home for the expansion team. Commissioner Juan C. Zapata, who sponsored the item, said: "I think we did [Beckham] a big disservice. I know that when I've met with him, I have apologized, because I think we could have treated him better."

==== Museum Park (2014) ====
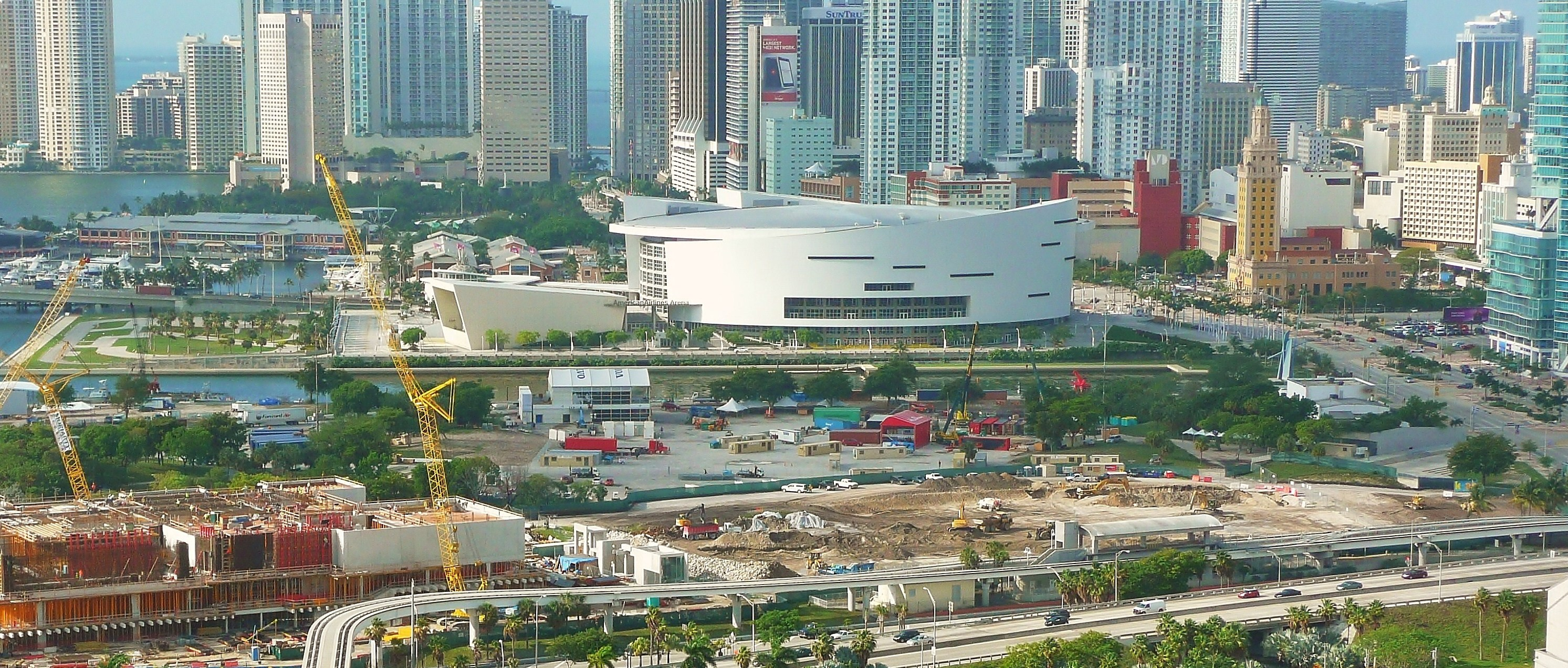
Under the second proposal, the stadium would have been built in Museum Park, with the boat slip adjacent to the Kaseya Center filled in.

On May 5, 2014, with the PortMiami proposal facing fierce opposition, Miami-Dade County Mayor Carlos A. Giménez proposed an alternate location on the waterfront, by filling a boat slip between American Airlines Arena and Museum Park. Giménez wrote in a letter to Beckham's real estate adviser that "Downtown Miami would greatly benefit" from a waterfront park that included the stadium and pedestrian walkways. The land, owned by the city of Miami, would have had to be sold or conveyed to the county, and Miami Mayor Tomás Regalado said filling the slip "would be a monumental task." Giménez and Regaldo discussed filling the slip in December 2013, but said the land was not being considered for a soccer stadium.

Following a meeting with Mayors Regalado and Gimenez, Beckham's group announced on May 19, 2014, that the boat slip location had become "Plan A". The site required approval from the commissioners of the city and county, who both owned parts of the land needed for the stadium, and the city charter required a public vote. According to plans presented by Beckham's group on May 22, 2014, the 20,000-seat stadium would take up 4.2 acres (1.7 ha) of the 19-acre (7.7 ha) park, while adding 8.5 acres (3.4 ha) by filling the deep-water basin.

The Miami Marlins had considered the boat slip location for its new stadium, but rejected the plan, as it would have cost millions of dollars to pump out water and transport rocks from elsewhere to fill the slip.

Critics warned the stadium would put a strain on area roads and pipes and others criticized using a public parkland for a stadium, and residents of nearby condominiums expressed concerns that the stadium may obstruct the ocean view.

After the city reported that the two sides were "too far apart" in negotiations over rent, Mayor Regalado and City Manager Daniel Alfonso turned down the proposal on June 10, 2014, and the proposal was rejected.

==== Little Havana (2014) ====
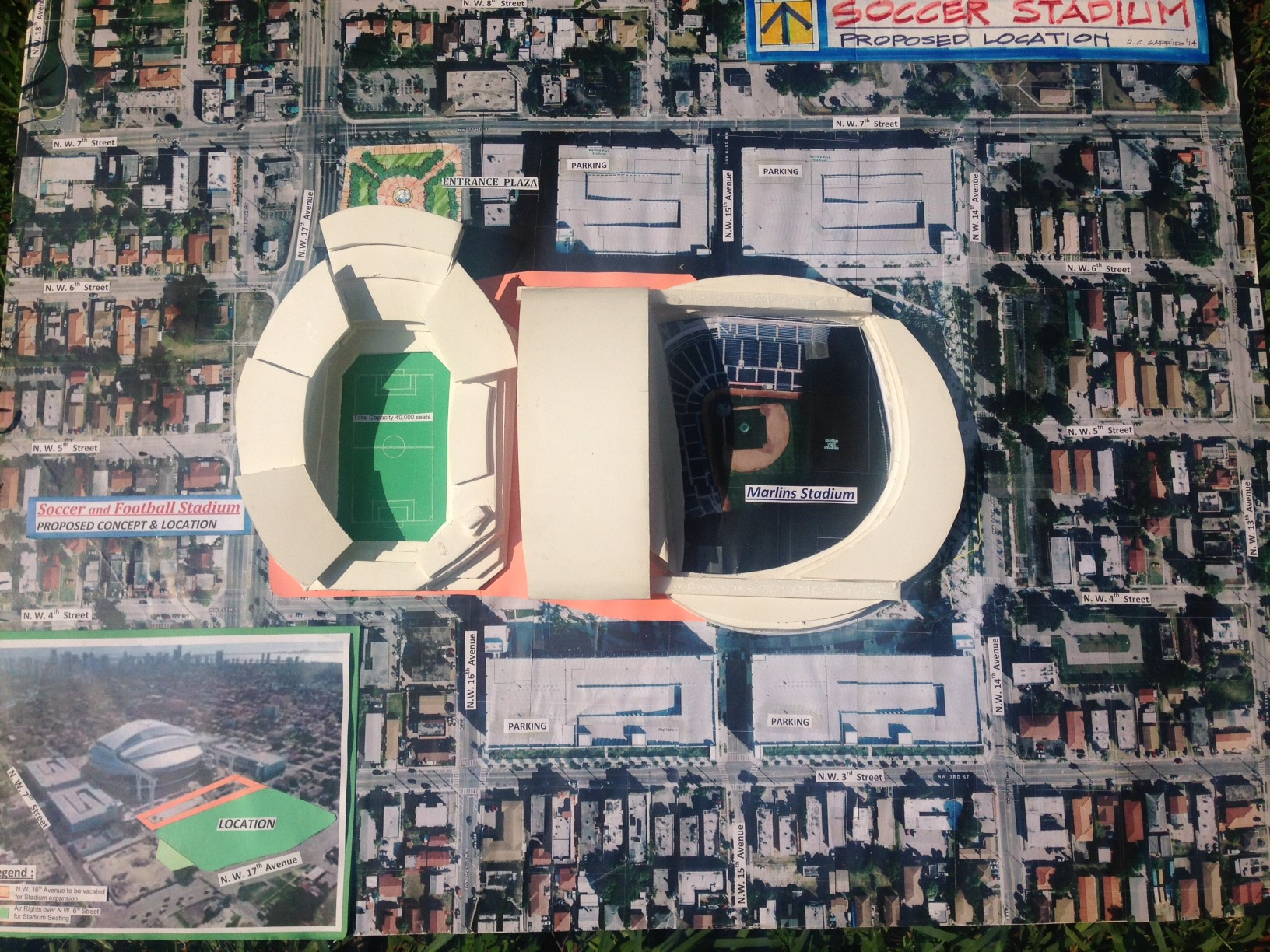
Rendering of the proposed site next to LoanDepot Park

MLS president Mark Abbott said in June 2014 that the league was not interested in building in Little Havana next to Marlins Park, now known as LoanDepot Park (although the initial plans included a soccer stadium to be built alongside it, a plan supported by the league in 2008).

In February 2015, Miami-Dade County commissioner Xavier Suárez suggested two previously proposed sites – next to Marlins Park and on the Miami River near Miami International Airport. Suárez told the Miami New Times that he had already discussed the latter location with Beckham's advisor and the developer who owns the land, previously a Bertram Yacht boatyard. Suárez said both locations fit a broad interpretation of the league's insistence on a "downtown" location and the Marlins Park location's "taint" had faded.

On March 4, 2015, Miami-Dade County commissioners passed a resolution calling on Mayor Gimenez to negotiate with Beckham's group over a county-owned parcel of land on the west side of Marlins Park.

On July 17, 2015, Miami Mayor Tomás Regalado announced a tentative deal to build the park on city-owned land next to Marlins Park, pending approval from the Miami City Commission (city council). However, in November 2015, Commissioner Francis Suarez said it was taken off the city commission agenda for December 1, 2015, where approval was required to get the stadium on the March 2016 ballot. Suarez cited Beckham's group's inability to secure deals with private landowners.

When the team was announced in March 2014, Miami International Airport, Marlins Park and Florida International University were mentioned as alternative sites should downtown stadium plans fall through.

Cities in neighboring Broward County were asked in July 2014 to forward a list of possible locations for a stadium and the county previously offered a county-owned site next to the BB&T Center in Sunrise as a possible site. Before the team was announced, Palm Beach County Sports Commission contacted Beckham's group and proposed FAU Stadium for the team.

The ownership group released a statement saying that a downtown Miami site was still preferred, but added, "there are other cities that would welcome an MLS club owned by [Beckham] and his partners."

In August 2014, Commissioner Don Garber told Alexi Lalas of ESPN that the league "will not expand to Miami unless we have a downtown site for the stadium."

In May 2015, University of Miami President Donna Shalala met with Beckham and his group to discuss a possible joint stadium for the MLS team and the Miami Hurricanes football team. Shalala said Sun Life Stadium, the existing home stadium with a capacity of over 65,000, was too big for the Hurricanes, but at the same time their target size of around 44,000 seats was too big for MLS.

==== Overtown (2015) ====
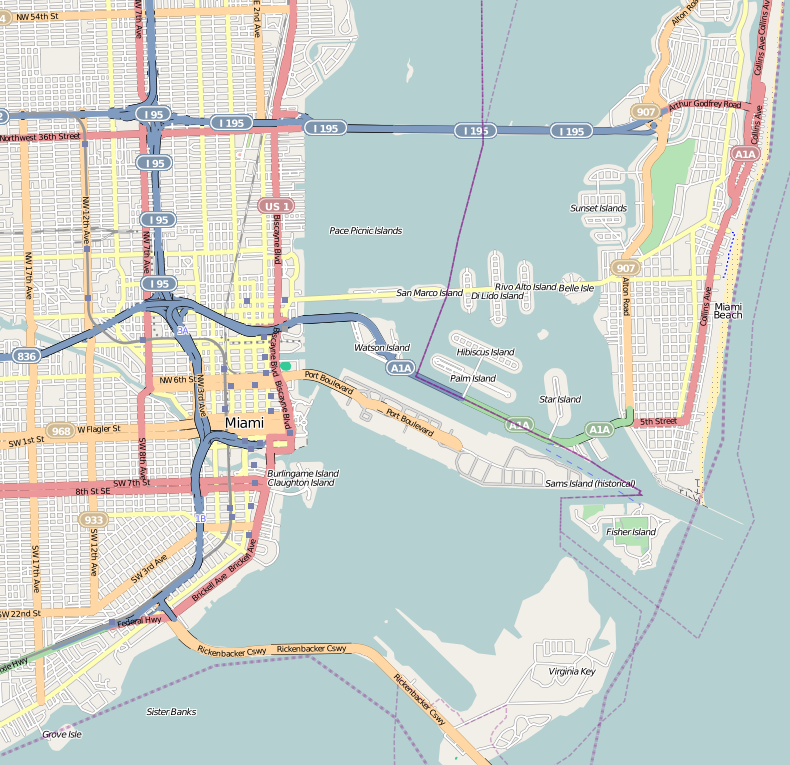
Overtown (Central Miami)

On December 4, 2015, Beckham's group announced it had secured a contract to purchase a privately owned block in Overtown at 650 NW 8th Street near Culmer station, Interstate 95, and the Miami River. It also secured a letter of intent from Miami-Dade Mayor Carlos Giménez to negotiate the purchase of the block to the south, owned by the county. The Overtown site was the fourth proposed location announced by Beckham since the expansion team was awarded to Miami, but this was the first time the group dropped its attempt to avoid paying property taxes by having the city or county serve as the stadium's landlord. On December 5, the MLS governing board endorsed the location, and on March 24, 2016, it was reported by the Miami Herald that Beckham's group completed the purchase of the privately owned land portion needed for the soccer stadium. On June 6, 2017, the ownership group acquired the 3 acres (1.2 ha) of county land required to begin construction.

However, after Jorge Mas, who leads the South Miami construction and engineering firm MasTec with his brother Jose, joined Beckham's team, it announced it planned to abandon the Overtown site for a larger development near Miami International Airport.

==== Freedom Park (2018) ====
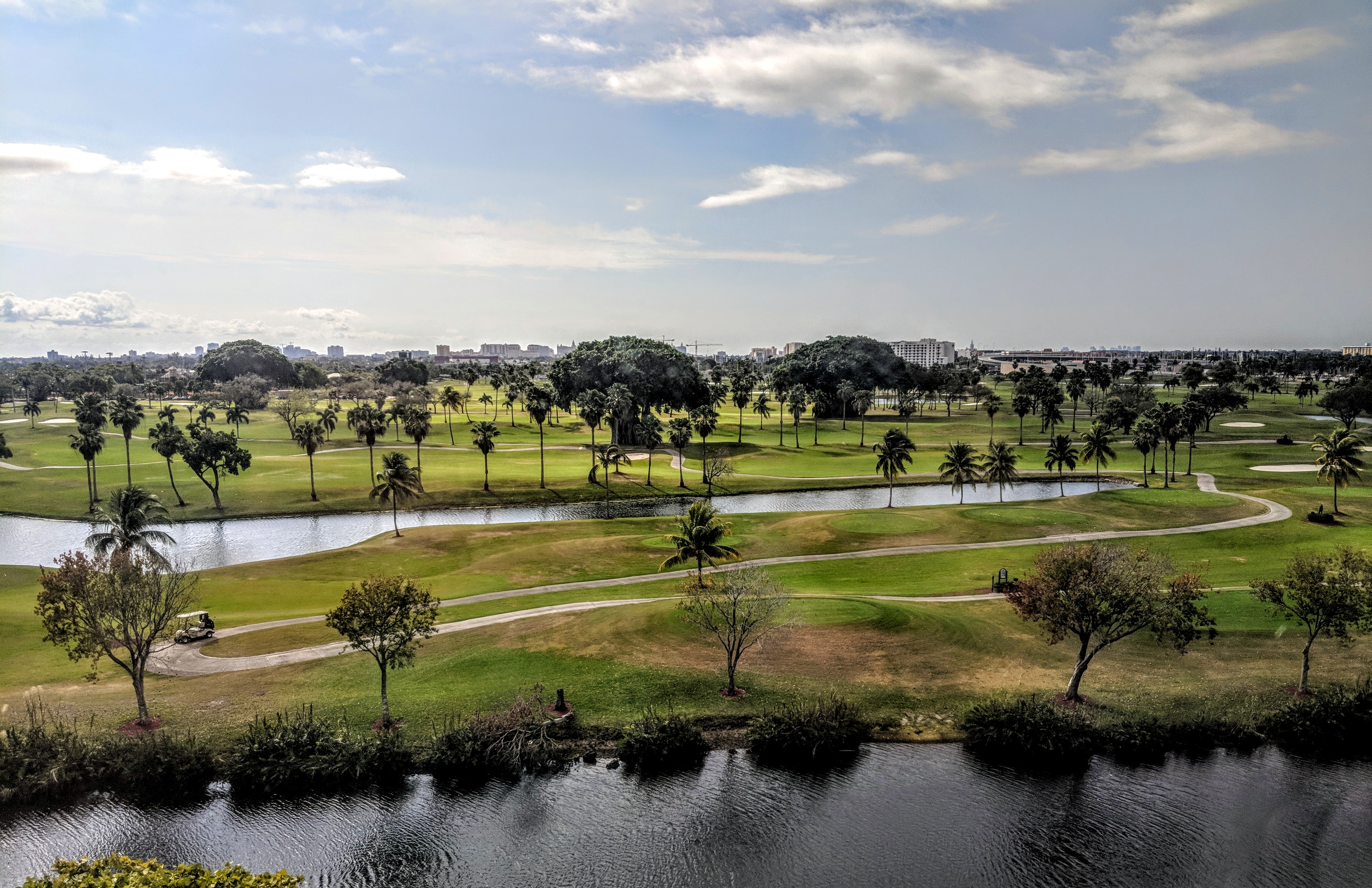
Melreese Country Club, the site of the future Freedom Park and stadium, photographed in 2019.

In July 2018, Beckham and Mas unveiled plans for a 25,000-seat stadium as part of Freedom Park, a mixed-use complex at the site of the city-owned Melreese Country Club near the airport. The development, to be built on 131 acres (53 ha) of public land, would include 1 million square feet (93,000 m^{2}) of office, retail, and commercial space, 750 hotel rooms, 23 acres (9.3 ha) of public soccer fields in addition to the 10.5-acre (4.2 ha) stadium, and the remaining 58 acres (23 ha) would be a public park. The owners would also make annual installment payments of $20 million for 30 years for improvements to public parks across the city. City commissioners voted to approve a referendum on the November 2018 ballot that would ask if the city should negotiate a no-bid lease with the investors. The measure passed with 60% of the vote, and will next require four out of five votes from city commissioners.

Owing to concerns over the plan, the PGA Tour Latinoamérica moved the Shell Championship season-ending event from Melreese to Trump National Doral Miami Golden Palm in October 2018.

In June 2019, Beckham projected that the stadium would open by 2022. On August 20, 2019, Mayor Francis Suarez confirmed a recent report that soil contamination at Melreese golf course, the proposed site for the stadium, was far worse than previously thought. According to CBS Miami, "...arsenic contamination levels are more than twice what is allowed by law. Barium and lead levels are also too high and there is debris in the soil that could cause physical hazards."

On April 28, 2022, the Miami City Council voted 4–1 to grant Inter Miami a 99-year lease for the Melreese site, with the stadium projected to open in the 2025 MLS season.

=== Construction ===
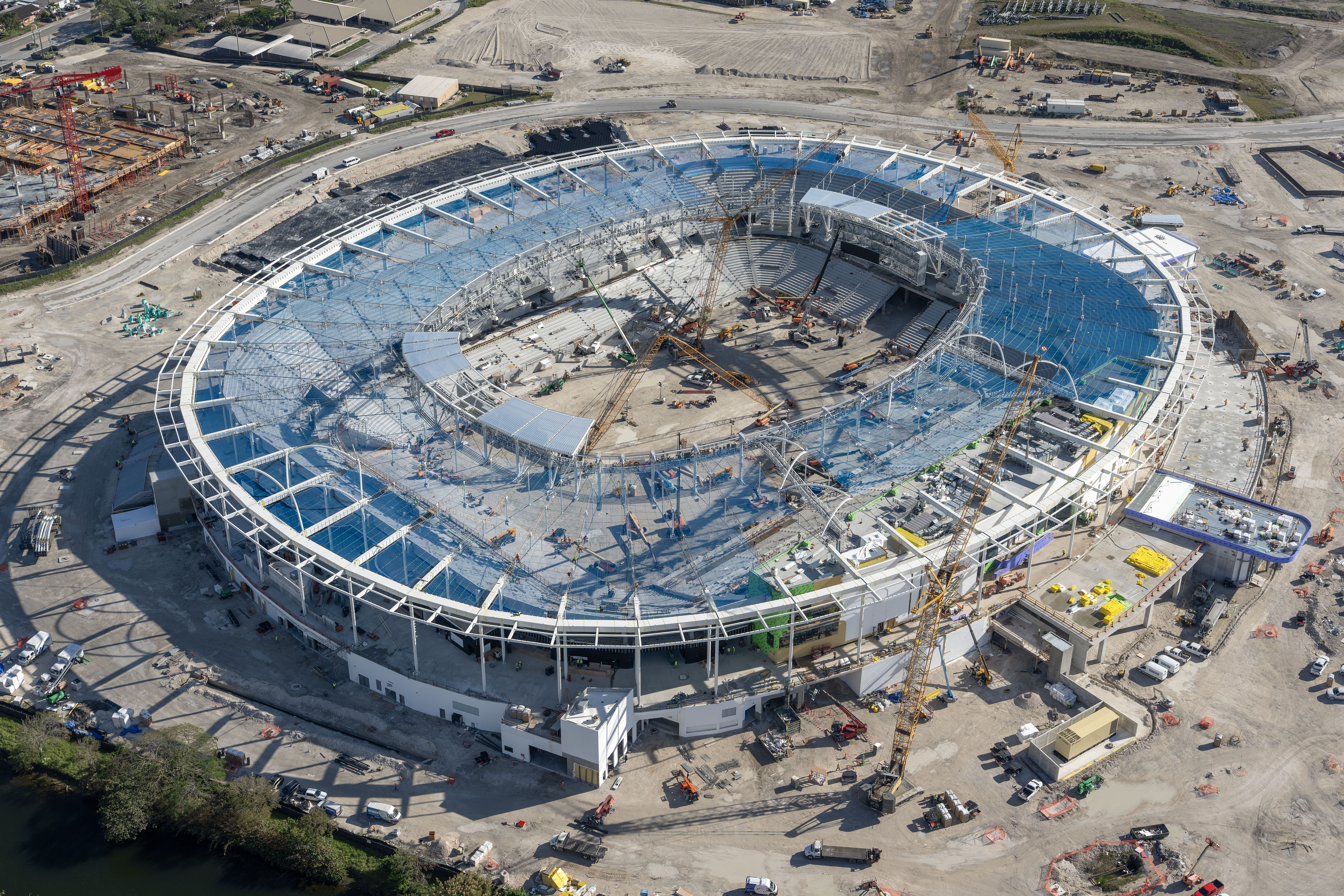
Construction of the stadium in January 2026

On March 19, 2023, Melreese Golf Course was shut down to make way for the construction of Miami Freedom Park. Construction of Miami Freedom Park began in August 2023, with intentions to open in 2026. A groundbreaking ceremony was to be set later in the year.

On August 8, 2024, Governor Ron DeSantis announced an $8 million grant to construct road infrastructure around the stadium. The grant was allocated from the Governor's Job Growth Grant Fund.

On March 3, 2026, the team announced a naming rights deal with Brazilian financial technology company Nubank, under which the stadium will be known as Nu Stadium. On March 27, 2026, Inter Miami announced that they would be naming a portion of the stadium's east stand as the "Leo Messi Stand"; the section covers blocks 117–121 of the lower bowl and 217–223 of the upper bowl.

=== Opening ===
Nu Stadium hosted its inaugural match on April 4, 2026, against Austin FC, with the match ending in a draw of 2–2 and Guilherme Biro scoring the first goal in the stadium's history. Lionel Messi scored the first Inter Miami goal at the stadium. 26,412 fans were in attendance for the opening match at the venue. The first win for Inter Miami at Nu Stadium would happen on May 17, 2026 where they defeated the Portland Timbers 2–0 in front of 26,715 fans.

The first international game took place on June 5, 2026 when Peru defeated Haiti 2–1 in front of 26,700 fans.

Mexican country musician Carín León was the first musical artist to perform at the stadium, with the concert taking place on June 28, 2026.

The 2027 FIFA Women's Champions Cup will take place from January 27–31 at the stadium.

== Transportation ==
Nu Stadium is located near Miami International Airport and the adjoining Miami Intermodal Center, a rail and bus transfer station. It is served by the MIA Mover, which will connect riders to/from the airport, Metrorail trains to Downtown Miami, Tri-Rail commuter rail to the northern suburbs and counties, and express bus service to Miami Beach. The Intermodal Center is located on the north side of the canal that separates the stadium site from the airport.

A 1,450-foot, grade-separated pedestrian bridge linking the transit hub with Miami Freedom Park will begin construction in 2027 and be completed by the second quarter of 2029.

Tri-Rail operates special trains for weekend matches that depart 45 minutes after the final whistle. The club also offers a $10 beverage and concessions voucher to attendees who show proof of using public transportation to reach the stadium.

The stadium has over 4,500 on-site parking spaces, the largest capacity at any MLS stadium. Nu Stadium also has 2.51 miles (4.04 km) of new roadways.
