= Inter Miami CF =

American soccer club based in Miami

Inter Miami
- Full name: Club Internacional de Fútbol Miami
- Nickname: The Herons
- Short name: Inter Miami
- Founded: January 29, 2018; 8 years ago
- Stadium: Nu Stadium; Miami, Florida
- Capacity: 26,700
- Owners: David Beckham; Jorge Mas; Jose Mas
- President: David Beckham
- Head coach: Kily González
- League: Major League Soccer
- 2026: Eastern Conference: 2nd Overall: 3rd Playoffs: TBD
- Website: intermiamicf.com
Home colors	Away colors	Third colors

Club Internacional de Fútbol Miami (lit. 'Miami International Football Club'), commonly referred to as Inter Miami (Spanish: Inter de Miami), is an American professional soccer club based in Miami, Florida, United States. The club competes in Major League Soccer (MLS) as a member of the Eastern Conference. Since April 2026, Inter Miami plays home matches at Nu Stadium, having played at the interim Chase Stadium prior.

MLS officially approved the Miami expansion team on January 29, 2018, following a prolonged effort to establish a new top-flight professional club in the city. The club attracted international attention from its inception because of co-owner David Beckham, and entered a new period of sporting and commercial prominence following the arrival of Lionel Messi in 2023. Following Messi's debut, Inter Miami won the Leagues Cup in 2023, its first major trophy, before adding the Supporters' Shield in 2024, MLS Cup in 2025 and the Campeones Cup in 2026. During this period, the club also made its debuts in the CONCACAF Champions Cup and FIFA Club World Cup as hosts.

Inter Miami's international profile and commercial stature have grown substantially since Messi's arrival. According to Forbes, the club was valued at $1.2 billion as of 2025, making it the second-most valuable club in MLS behind Los Angeles FC. In addition to its first team, the club operates a youth development system and Inter Miami CF II, its reserve team.

== History ==
=== Expansion ===
In November 2012, Major League Soccer (MLS) commissioner Don Garber confirmed the league's renewed interest in placing an expansion franchise in Miami, after the Miami Fusion folded following the 2001 season. A Miami expansion team led by Barcelona and Marcelo Claure, a Bolivian businessman based in the city, announced an expansion bid in October 2008, with plans to begin play in 2011. In March 2009, the league and Barcelona announced that Miami was no longer a candidate due to local market conditions. Additionally, MLS expressed concerns about Miami's lack of fan interest in an MLS franchise, the fact that USL team Miami FC was not doing well, and the plan to use the FIU Stadium, relegating the team to a secondary tenant in a college football stadium with an artificial surface. However, Garber said that Miami would be an expansion target in the future. Claure later joined David Beckham's group of investors for the Miami expansion bid that was accepted by the league in 2014.

When David Beckham, whose business manager Simon Fuller had the idea of giving him an option to purchase an expansion team at a price of $25 million when he joined the league in 2007, ended his playing career in April 2013, MLS held discussions with Fuller about several expansion targets, including Miami. That same year, other investors, including Italian financier Alessandro Butini and Miami Dolphins owner Stephen M. Ross expressed interest in owning a Miami franchise as well. In 2013, Fuller and Beckham discussed plans to buy an MLS soccer team in Miami.

In 2013, when David Beckham was interviewed by CNN, he thanked Fuller for the groundbreaking MLS deal he had negotiated back in 2007 and specifically the clause that Fuller had insisted on inserting to the player's benefit: "When I signed my contract six, seven years ago, my manager Simon Fuller actually got a clause in the contract that enabled me to have a franchise at the end of my playing career." In his December 2013 State of the League address, Garber had identified Beckham and Fuller as potential owners in Miami. Later that month, on December 17, Miami-Dade County commissioners voted unanimously to allow Mayor Carlos A. Giménez to negotiate with the Beckham-led group on a new stadium in downtown Miami. The league announced that Beckham exercised his option on February 5, 2014, and that Miami Beckham United, the investment group led by Beckham, Fuller and Claure, would own an expansion franchise in Miami, assuming that financing for a stadium could be agreed upon. In presentations to officials and potential investors, the ownership group used "Miami Vice" and "Miami Current" as working titles for the club. After its initial stadium proposals fell through, Commissioner Garber reiterated in August 2014 that the expansion would not be approved until a downtown stadium plan was secured and it was only after Fuller introduced Beckham to Jorge and José Mas, that the plan was green lit. In an August 2014 Q&A session, deputy commissioner Mark Abbott said Miami would be the 23rd team as long as a downtown stadium deal could be reached. Beckham bought Fuller out in May 2019.

On January 29, 2018, the Miami Beckham United group (consisting of Beckham, Claure, Fuller, Masayoshi Son (founder and CEO of SoftBank) and Jorge and José Mas, the Miami-based leaders of telecommunications and construction company MasTec) four years after the ownership's original announcement of pursuing a team, was awarded the twenty-fifth MLS franchise and was set to launch in the 2020 season. The announcement represented part of a larger MLS expansion that would increase its number of teams to 26 by 2020 and 30 after that. Since Beckham's original announcement of his intention to place a team in Miami in 2014, Orlando City, New York City FC, Atlanta United, Minnesota United, Los Angeles FC and FC Cincinnati had all begun MLS play. Paul McDonough was hired as sporting director effective August 4. The team's ownership group was later renamed Miami Freedom Park LLC. They announced Club Internacional de Fútbol Miami, shortened to Inter Miami CF, as the club's official name on September 5, 2018.

With the addition of Inter Miami and Nashville SC for the 2020 season, Major League Soccer organized the 2019 MLS Expansion Draft on November 19, 2019. On October 6, 2019, Inter Miami won the coin toss for the Expansion Priority Draft, and chose to select first in the expansion draft. Lists of protected rosters and draft-eligible players were released by MLS on November 16, 2019.

On December 30, 2019, former Uruguay national team player and C.F. Monterrey manager Diego Alonso was announced as the club's inaugural head coach. On February 14, 2020, Pizarro left Monterrey for Major League Soccer expansion side Inter Miami, following a protracted dispute between the clubs about the activation of his release clause, rejoining head coach Diego Alonso for a third time, his coach at both Pachuca and Monterrey. The following day, despite not officially being announced as a signing for the club, Pizarro scored the first goal for Miami in a 2–1 preseason friendly loss to the Philadelphia Union. That same day, Monterrey filed a complaint with FIFA against Pizarro and Inter Miami for improper contact between the player and Inter Miami co-owner David Beckham while Pizarro was still under contract with Monterrey. FIFA's investigation was still on-going when news of the complaint broke on March 4.

=== Early years (2020–2023) ===
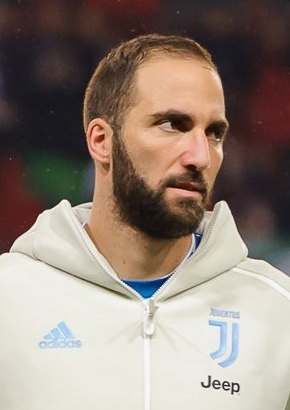
Argentine striker Gonzalo Higuaín signed with Miami in September 2020.

Inter Miami's first MLS game was played on March 1, 2020, losing 1–0, away to Los Angeles FC. Designated Player Rodolfo Pizarro scored the first goal in Inter Miami history the following game on March 7, in a 2–1 loss to D.C. United. Their first home match was supposed to be on March 14, 2020, against the LA Galaxy, Beckham's former club, but it was delayed due to the COVID-19 pandemic. On August 23, 2020, Inter Miami recorded their first franchise victory, 3–2 over Orlando City. On January 7, 2021, Diego Alonso left by mutual consent. On January 18, 2021, England Women's manager Phil Neville was appointed as the new head coach, and the Seattle Sounders' Chris Henderson as chief soccer officer and sporting director. On March 23, 2021, it was announced that Kieran Gibbs would join Inter Miami when his contract with West Brom expired in the summer. On February 23, 2023, Gibbs and Miami mutually agreed to terminate his deal at the club. He subsequently joined the club's broadcasting team. On August 13, 2020, Matuidi signed for Major League Soccer club Inter Miami on a free transfer. He made his club debut on September 6, in a scoreless home draw against Nashville SC in Major League Soccer. In January 2022, Matuidi was left off Inter Miami's roster for the 2022 season. On December 23, 2022, Matuidi announced his retirement from professional soccer after an 18-year career. On January 26, 2022, Romeo Beckham made his non-competitive senior debut for Inter Miami during a 4–0 pre-season win against Universitario.

In 2021, the Mas brothers finalized a buyout to take over majority ownership of the team from Claure and Son. On May 28, 2021, MLS announced that it would sanction Inter Miami owner Jorge Mas and former sporting director Paul McDonough for violating roster rules during the 2020 season. The club had signed Blaise Matuidi and Andrés Reyes using targeted allocation money (TAM) to comply with salary cap requirements and avoid using its three Designated Player slots, but were found to have exceeded the TAM maximum of $1.61 million per player. MLS fined the club $2 million and reduced its allocation by $2.27 million for the 2022 and 2023 seasons, while Mas was fined $250,000 and McDonough was suspended from league activities through the end of the 2022 season. In May 2021, Inter Miami had to pay a $2 million fine for breaking MLS rules, as Matuidi was the fourth designated player in the team rather than the permitted three. Prior to the announcement, Matuidi was reclassified as a Designated Player by taking the slot occupied by Matías Pellegrini, who was loaned to Inter Miami II after his contract was bought out by the club. On July 19, 2022, Inter Miami had a friendly game match with Barcelona, losing 6–0. On September 18, 2020, Higuaín signed for Inter Miami. On his debut, he missed a penalty and then started a fight as Miami fell to a 3–0 defeat to the Philadelphia Union. On October 7, Higuaín scored his first goal for Miami, a late free kick in their 2–1 win against the New York Red Bulls. On July 31, 2022, Higuaín scored another free-kick for Inter Miami, and then netted two more goals to complete a first-half hat-trick in 27 minutes against FC Cincinnati in a 4–4 draw. Higuaín retired at the end of Inter Miami's 2022 MLS season; his last game was in the first round of the MLS playoffs, ending in 3–0 away loss to New York City FC.

On January 20, 2022, it was announced that Leonardo Campana would join Major League Soccer club Inter Miami on a season-long loan from Premier League side Wolverhampton Wanderers. He made his debut for Inter Miami on February 26, 2022, starting in a 0–0 draw versus the Chicago Fire. Campana scored his first goal for Inter Miami on March 6, 2022, their only goal in a 5–1 loss to Austin FC. Campana was named MLS Player of the Week for Week 6 of the 2022 season on April 11, 2022, for his hat trick against the New England Revolution. Campana signed with Miami on a permanent basis on January 20, 2023. He occupies a Young Designated Player roster slot and is signed through the end of the 2025 season, with a club option to extend through 2026. On September 15, 2023, Inter Miami announced the signing of forward Leonardo Campana to a contract extension through the 2027 Major League Soccer (MLS) season, with an option for 2028. On January 18, 2023, it was announced that Atlanta United striker Josef Martínez had been traded to Inter Miami. Martínez made his Inter Miami debut in a match against CF Montréal on February 25, 2023, ending in a 2–0 win.

DeAndre Yedlin joined Inter Miami on February 2, 2022, on a four-year contract with an additional one-year option. "It's almost a DP signing for us, really, in terms of his quality," head coach Phil Neville said. "He's played at the top, top level in the top soccer nations in the world. So we hope his experience, his quality, his leadership, and the fact that he's American I think is really important. We have a young, new team and we want experience in there as well." Yedlin stated "I know when I was in MLS, [defending] was a weakness in my game", after the move was announced. "Not only 1-v-1 but positionally. But now I'm coming back, being in a lot of different situations and a lot of different formations, playing different positions to a point now where I'm a lot more comfortable in those situations. I think I'm a lot better defender now than I was when I left."

=== Lionel Messi era (2023–present) ===
On June 1, 2023, Inter Miami announced that the club had parted ways with Neville, with the club in last place in the Eastern Conference. Four days later, then seven-time Ballon d'Or winner Lionel Messi announced his intention to join the club as a free agent after leaving Paris Saint-Germain, turning down an offer to play for Saudi Pro League club Al Hilal and ruling out a return to Barcelona. Messi signed his Designated Player contract on July 15, joining the team through the 2023 MLS season. Argentine and former Barça manager Gerardo Martino was appointed head coach on June 28 and joined the following month.

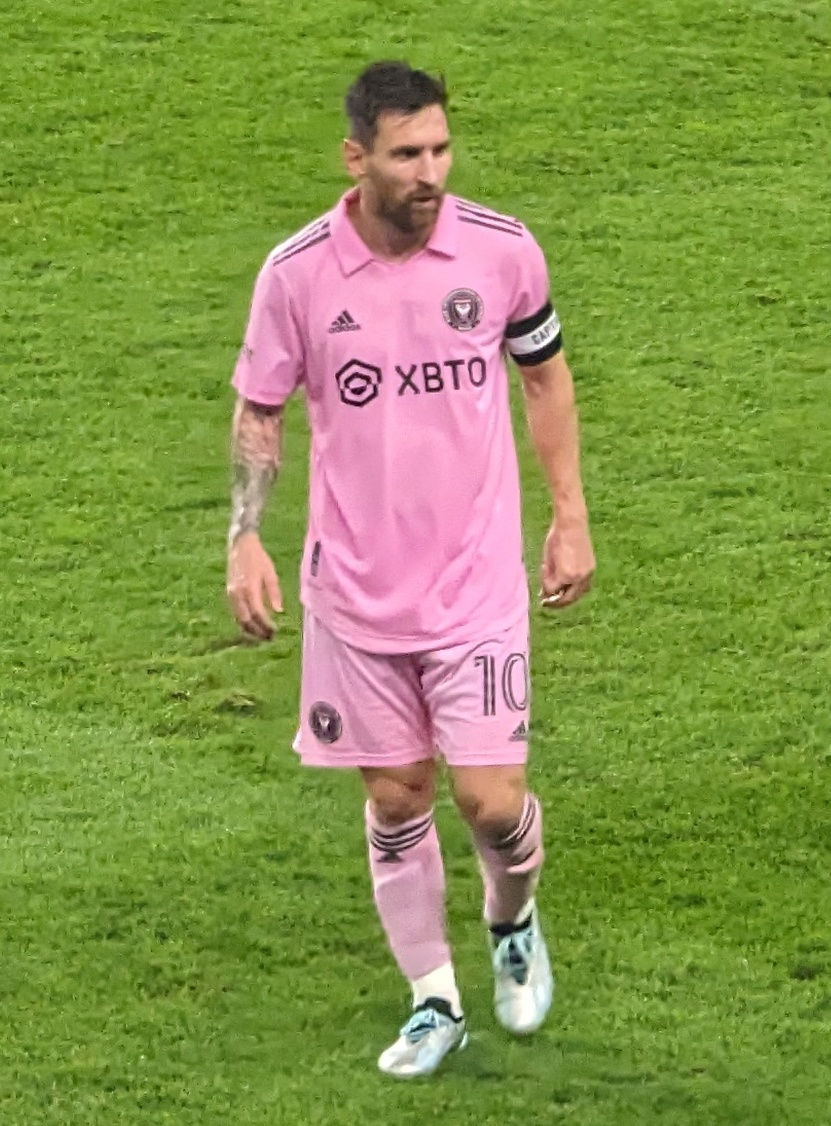
Argentine forward Lionel Messi signed with Inter Miami in July 2023.

Messi formally joined the team, alongside former Barcelona teammate Sergio Busquets, at an unveiling ceremony on July 16; Five days later, another former Barcelona teammate, Jordi Alba, signed for Miami. Following Messi's arrival, Inter Miami became the top selling team across all sports on e-commerce retailer Fanatics, while Messi broke the record for most shirt sales in 24 hours. The average price for tickets to Miami matches on StubHub increased five-fold to $161. Inter Miami was one of the top Google searches of 2023. Forbes valued Inter Miami around $1 billion, an increase of 72% from 2023, making it the second MLS club to be valued at a billion dollars. Asensi said the club would make north of $200 million in revenue in 2024, far beyond 2022 revenue, reported to be $50-60 million.

Messi and Busquets made their debuts on July 21 at home in a 2–1 win over Cruz Azul in the 2023 Leagues Cup, with both coming on at the 54th minute. Messi scored the winner from a free-kick in stoppage time, ending Miami's 11-game winless streak. On August 19, in the 2023 Leagues Cup final against Nashville SC, Inter Miami lifted its first-ever trophy, winning 10–9 on penalties after a 1–1 draw. Following this win, Inter Miami qualified for the CONCACAF Champions Cup for the first time; the team began play in the round of 16.

On August 23 in the 2023 U.S. Open Cup, Inter Miami beat FC Cincinnati on penalties 5–4 after a 3–3 draw in extra time to go into the final on September 27, where they lost to the Houston Dynamo 2–1, after Messi was unable to play. On August 26 Messi, Busquets and Alba made their first appearances in the MLS against the New York Red Bulls, which ended in a 2–0 victory. Messi netted the concluding goal. On September 16, Miami were defeated for the first time in the Messi era, without Messi or Alba playing against Atlanta United, losing 5–2, ending their 12-match unbeaten run. On October 7, Miami were defeated by FC Cincinnati, despite Messi being subbed on in the 55th minute. This result eliminated them from making the MLS playoffs. The Decision Day match between Inter Miami and Charlotte FC was held on October 21. Miami were defeated 1–0, despite having Messi on for the entire match.

On October 30, Inter Miami became the only MLS team to have a current player win the Ballon d'Or, when Messi secured his 8th award. Because of this, Inter Miami played a friendly match with New York City FC named Noche d'Or. Messi's 8th Ballon was presented at DRV PNK Stadium while the team lost 2–1.

On December 22, 2023, Inter Miami signed Uruguayan forward Luis Suárez, another former Barcelona teammate of Messi. In February 2024, a pre-season friendly against a Hong Kong XI led to a controversy due to Messi's absence. The Argentine Football Association and Chinese Football Association paused their partnership as a result. The loss in the 2024 CONCACAF Champions Cup against Monterrey led the team to miss out on qualifying for the 2024 FIFA Intercontinental Cup tournament. On October 3, Miami secured their first Supporters' Shield after a brace by Messi and a header by Suárez against the Columbus Crew. On the last day of the season, Miami defeated the New England Revolution 6–2, to finish with a league record 74 points. On October 19, FIFA announced that Miami would be awarded with the host spot in the 2025 FIFA Club World Cup.

On November 10, 2024, Inter Miami was eliminated in the first round of the MLS playoffs, losing 3–2 to Atlanta United in one of the biggest upsets in MLS history. Messi's compatriot and former Barcelona teammate, Javier Mascherano, was hired as the new head coach. Inter Miami then hosted the opening of the 2025 FIFA Club World Cup against the record African champions Al Ahly, which resulted in a goalless draw. The club achieved a historic 2–1 win against European club Porto in the group stage, and became the first CONCACAF club to defeat a European club in official competition. The victory also marked the first win for an MLS club in the history of the FIFA Club World Cup. Miami would ultimately be eliminated from the competition in the round of 16, suffering a 4–0 defeat to UEFA Champions League winners Paris Saint-Germain.

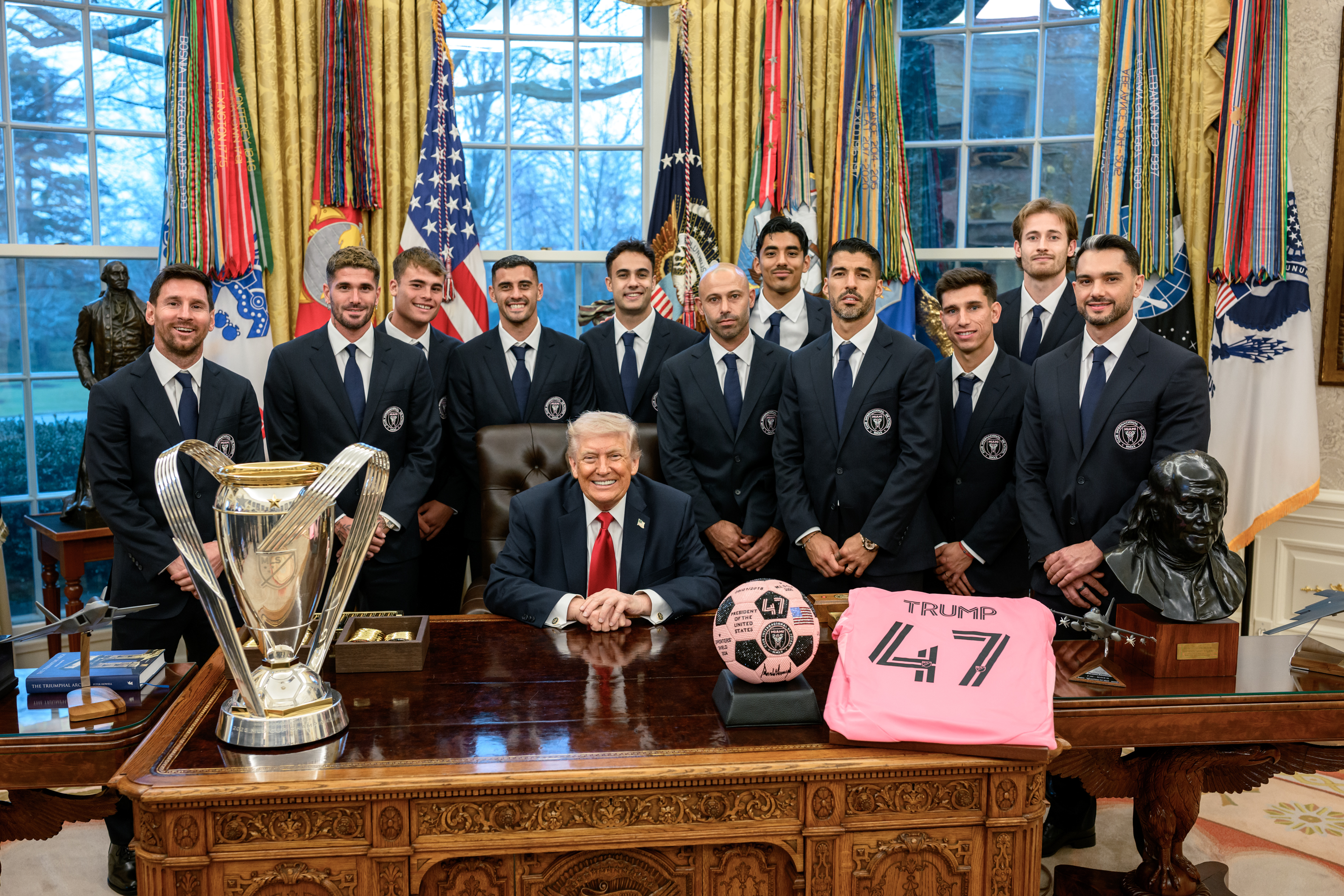
Inter Miami players celebrating their 2025 MLS Cup win at the White House

In the 2025 Leagues Cup semi-finals, Miami defeated rivals Orlando City 3–1, with Messi scoring a decisive second-half brace. Miami would lose the final 3–0 to the Seattle Sounders away at Lumen Field. Following the final whistle, a fight broke out between players and staff from both teams, with Suárez spitting on a Seattle staff member. As a result of the incident, Suárez, Busquets, and Tomás Avilés were fined and received suspensions from the competition; Suárez was handed an additional three match suspension from MLS. Inter Miami advanced to the final of the 2025 MLS Cup playoffs, where they secured a spot in the MLS Cup final against the Vancouver Whitecaps, a game which Miami won 3–1 to secure their first MLS Cup title.

== Colors and badge ==
The Miami Beckham United group unveiled the team's name and colors on September 5, 2018. The name was announced as Club Internacional de Fútbol Miami (Inter Miami CF). The crest, designed in style and colors that recall the city's Art Deco architectural tradition, displays two great white herons with interlocking legs forming a letter M. Between the herons is an eclipse, the sun bearing seven rays in an homage to the number Beckham often wore as a player. The full achievement displays the team name encircling all with the Roman numerals "MMXX" representing the year 2020, the inaugural season of play. The three pointed shield represents the three main communities of South Florida: Miami, Fort Lauderdale, and West Palm Beach. The club's colors are pink, white, black, and a bit of blue such as the "La Palma" jersey. Inter Miami's current sponsorship is with the Royal Caribbean Group.

The species of the birds in the crest was the subject of debate after its announcement and unveiling, with some speculating them to be flamingos and egrets. The team later announced that the birds are white herons.

The club's name has been the subject of a trademark dispute with Italian club Inter Milan, which had filed a claim with the U.S. Patent and Trademark Office for the protected use of "Inter" in Spring 2014. MLS filed an objection to the trademark claim in April 2019, arguing that the name "Inter" was generic due to its use by other clubs and could not be claimed exclusively. In February 2020, Inter Milan sued Inter Miami for trademark infringement, stating that the term "Inter" is synonymous with its club and no one else. The two sides signed a discreet settlement in 2021, allowing David Beckham's side to continue using their name.

=== Uniform history ===
==== Home ====
2020–2021	2022–2023	2024	2025–

==== Away ====
2020	2021–2022	2023–2024	2025	2026–

==== Third ====
2024	2025	2026

== Sponsorship ==
Season	Kit manufacturer	Shirt sponsor	Sleeve sponsor
2020	Adidas	—	Baptist Health
2021	Adidas	XBTO	—
2022	Adidas	XBTO	Xmanna
2023	Adidas	XBTO	Fracht Group
2024–2025	Adidas	Royal Caribbean	Fracht Group
2026–present	Adidas	Royal Caribbean	Lowe's

On April 9, 2021, Inter Miami CF and AutoNation announced a multi-layered three-year deal. In March 2024, Tudor was announced as the official timekeeper. In April 2024, Lowe's launched a partnership with the club where fans could meet players at select stores and earn loyalty points. Later, in May 2024, Visa announced their sponsorship of the club with a deal that gives it exclusive rights to activate the brand internationally.

== Stadium ==
=== Chase Stadium ===
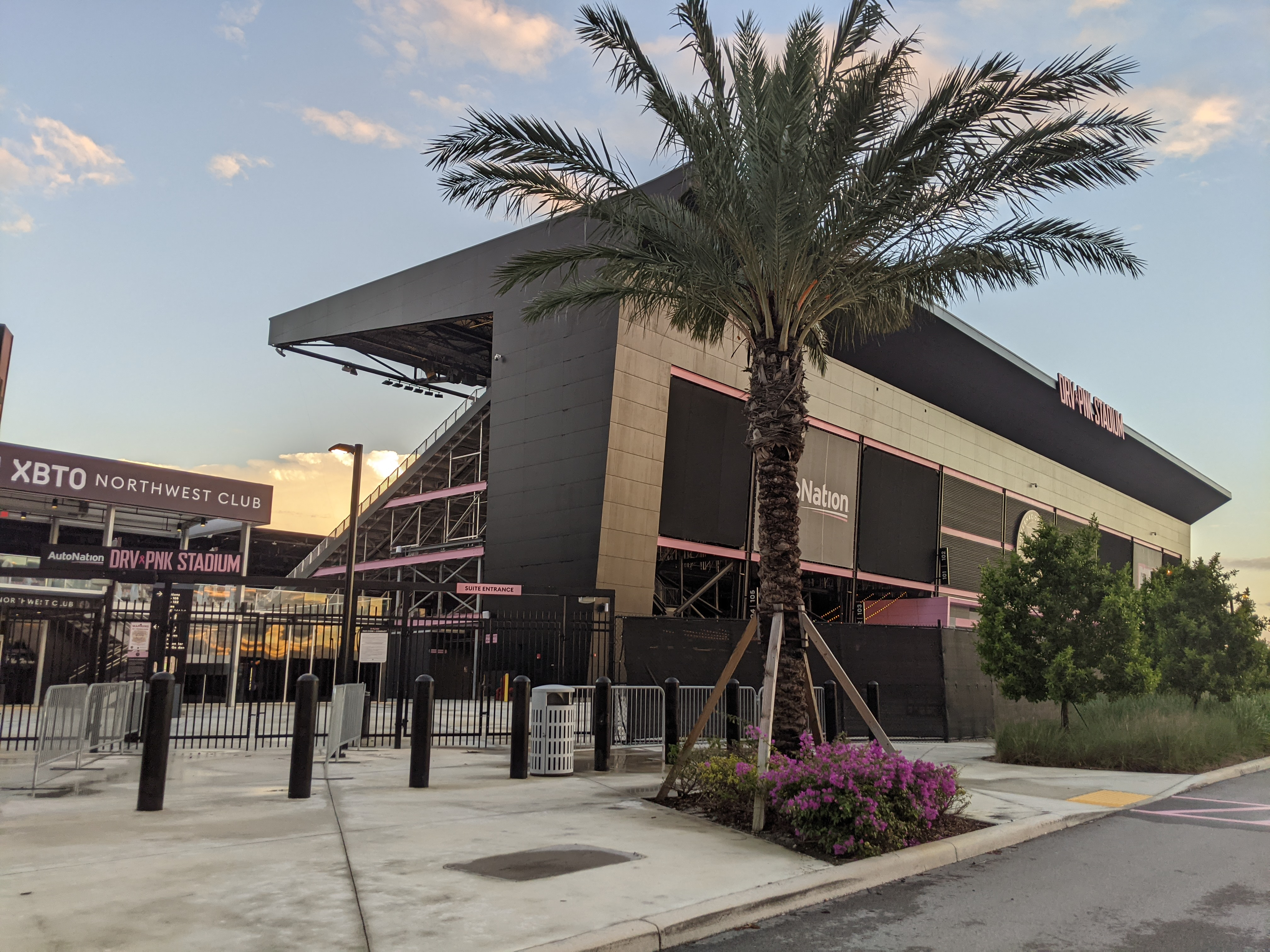
Chase Stadium entrance

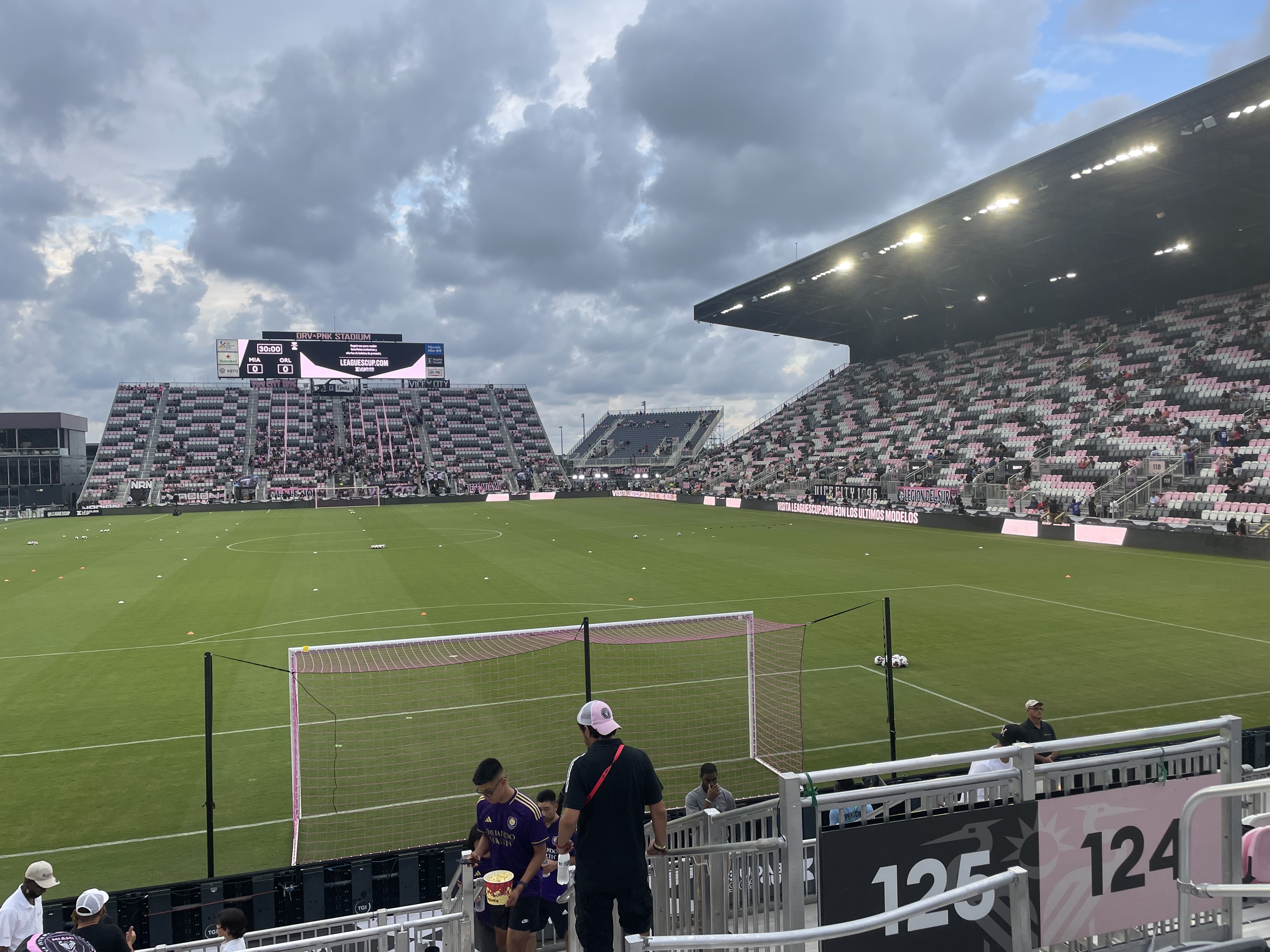
New seats were added for the stadium.

Chase Stadium, formerly known as DRV PNK Stadium, is a soccer stadium in Fort Lauderdale, Florida, on the site of the former Lockhart Stadium. The stadium is oriented north–south for soccer configuration, so the sun won't be in the eyes of the goalkeeper. The stadium is the primary headquarters for the team and its youth academy in addition to further training grounds. The cost of the whole renovation and creation of the soccer-specific stadium by Manica Architecture is $60 million or $140 million in total. Following Lionel Messi's June 2023 announcement of his planned move to Inter Miami, the club's managing owner Jorge Mas stated that the corners of the stadium would be filled to add 3,000 to 3,200 seats to handle some of the expected demand. The new sections use bleacher seating from the Miami International Autodrome, the temporary Formula One circuit built at the Hard Rock Stadium for the Miami Grand Prix. On February 20, 2024, the day before Inter Miami's opening match of the 2024 regular season, the team announced a multi-year naming rights partnership with JPMorgan Chase. The stadium was rebranded as Chase Stadium effective immediately. Pyro rooftop fireworks are also installed in the chase stadium.

The Fort Lauderdale Strikers announced in 2016 that they were moving out of Lockhart Stadium, after which the stadium fell into a state of disrepair. In late January 2019, Inter Miami announced its intentions to pursue the Lockhart Stadium site to serve as the club's training ground for its first team, USL League One reserve team Inter Miami II, and youth academy. The development would also include a 21,550-seat stadium, which will serve as the permanent home of Inter Miami CF II and as the interim home for Inter Miami for at least the first two seasons while Nu Stadium (Miami Freedom Park) stadium was under construction. The Fort Lauderdale city council unanimously approved Inter Miami's bid for the Lockhart Stadium site in March 2019. In April, the Fort Lauderdale City Commission cleared Inter Miami to begin the demolition process. On July 9, 2019, the Fort Lauderdale City Commission unanimously approved a 50-year lease agreement for the Lockhart Stadium site with Inter Miami; under the terms of the agreement, the city will retain ownership of the property while the soccer club will be responsible for the construction, operation, and maintenance of the new facilities. On April 8, 2021, it was reported that Inter Miami had reached a naming rights agreement with AutoNation; the agreement was officially announced the next day. The stadium was branded as DRV PNK Stadium, a tie-in with AutoNation's breast cancer awareness campaign. A second expansion was completed in January 2024 that increased capacity to 21,550 seats. A new section in the southwest corner, along with more seats in the northeast and southeast corners, added 1,200 seats; the expansion also included six "opera boxes" and nine "theatre boxes" with suite-like seats.

=== Nu Stadium ===
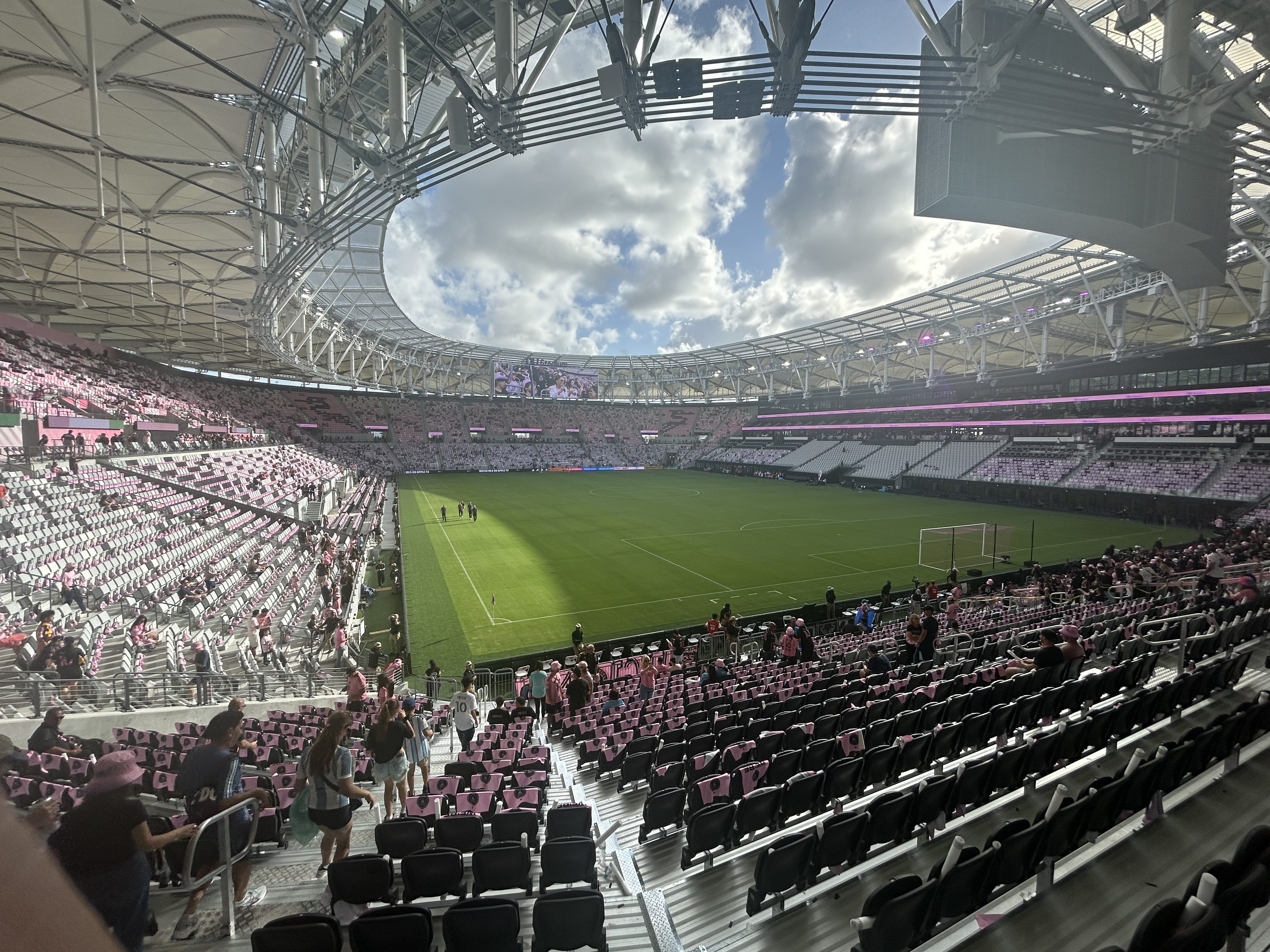
Interior of Nu Stadium during ahead of the first match

In March 2020, Inter Miami began to play in Fort Lauderdale. They will continue to do so until their new stadium, Nu Stadium, is completed. The 25,000-seat stadium will form part of Freedom Park, a mixed-use complex on the former site of the city-owned Melreese Country Club near the Miami International Airport. The whole project in total is worth over $1 billion.

The development, being built on 131-acre (53 ha) public land, will include 1,000,000 square feet (93,000 m^{2}) of office, retail and commercial space, 750 hotel rooms, 23 acres (9.3 ha) of public soccer fields in addition to the 10.5-acre (4.2 ha) stadium, and the remaining 58 acres (23 ha) will be a public park. The club owners will also make annual installments of $20 million for 30 years for improvements to public parks across the city. The site follows a lengthy exploration of other locations since Beckham's purchase of the franchise. Noted locations that had previously been considered included: Dodge Island at PortMiami (2013), the Downtown Miami waterfront at Museum Park (2014), a site adjacent to MLB's Marlins Park (2015), and a privately owned site in Miami's Overtown (2015–16).

Approval for construction of the stadium depended on the outcome of a public referendum held on November 6, 2018, and approval of city officials. Roughly 60% of referendum voters approved the measure, authorizing city administrators to negotiate a 99-year lease with the MLS team's ownership to develop Miami Freedom Park.

Beckham announced in June 2019 that Freedom Park has a proposed launch date 2022. On August 20, 2019, Miami Mayor Francis Suarez confirmed a recent report that soil contamination at Melreese golf course, the proposed site for the stadium, was far worse than previously thought. According to CBS Miami, "...arsenic contamination levels are more than twice what is allowed by law. Barium and lead levels are also too high and there is debris in the soil that could cause physical hazards." On April 28, 2022, the Miami City Commission voted 4–1 to grant Inter Miami a 99-year lease for the Melreese site, with the stadium projected to open in the 2025 MLS season. On March 19, 2023, Melreese Golf Course was shut down to make way for the construction of Miami Freedom Park. Construction of Miami Freedom Park began in August 2023, with intentions to open in 2025. A groundbreaking ceremony was to be set later in the year. In August 2023, it was announced that the final legal hurdle had been cleared and construction had finally commenced on the stadium, with the current projection of completion being 2026.

In March 2026, it was announced that the future stadium of Inter Miami at the Miami Freedom Park complex would be named Nu Stadium, following a naming rights agreement with the Brazilian fintech company NuBank.

=== Training complex ===
In late January 2019, the club announced its intentions to pursue the Lockhart Stadium site in Fort Lauderdale to serve as the club's training ground for its first team, youth academy, and future United Soccer League (USL) team.

The training facility, located north of Chase Stadium, covers 30 acres (12 ha) and includes a park, youth soccer fields, and a community center. It has seven training fields and is the permanent training facility for all levels of Inter Miami's teams, ranging from their Youth Academy teams and USL League One team to the senior team. The naming rights to the facility were purchased by insurance company Florida Blue in September 2022. The Florida Blue Training Center includes the 5,000-seat AutoNation Sports Field, which has been the home ground of Major League Rugby club Miami Sharks since their debut in 2024.

=== Transportation ===
The Freedom Park site is located near Miami International Airport and the adjoining Miami Intermodal Center, a rail and bus transfer station. It is served by Metrorail trains to Downtown Miami and Tri-Rail commuter rail to the northern suburbs and counties. The Intermodal Center is located on the north side of the canal that separates the stadium site from the airport.

Chase Stadium is located near Interstate 95 at its junction with Commercial Boulevard (State Route 870) in Fort Lauderdale. The stadium has three designated parking lots for pre-purchased ticketholders and an additional lot for other visitors. The nearest Tri-Rail commuter rail station is Cypress Creek, but additional nighttime train service is not provided for Inter Miami matches.

In April 2022, Inter Miami announced a partnership with Brightline to provide passenger trains from Miami and West Palm Beach to Fort Lauderdale station with a dedicated shuttle for fans. The service, named the GOOOL Getter, will have three round-trips before and after home matches.

On December 19, 2025, Tri-Rail stated that it will be announcing special service and hours for Inter Miami home games.

== Ownership ==
The ownership group behind the franchise was first formed in 2012 as Miami Beckham United, though it now trades under the name Miami Freedom Park LLC. The original ownership group was led by Miami-based Bolivian businessman Marcelo Claure, while Masayoshi Son and brothers Jorge and Jose Mas were added to the ownership group in 2017. The effort originated in a contract David Beckham signed with MLS in 2007; he joined LA Galaxy and negotiated an option to own an expansion team at a discounted franchise fee.

On September 17, 2021, it was announced that Beckham and the Mas brothers had bought out Claure and Son's stakes in the ownership group. Ares Management was also added to the ownership group.

== Supporters ==
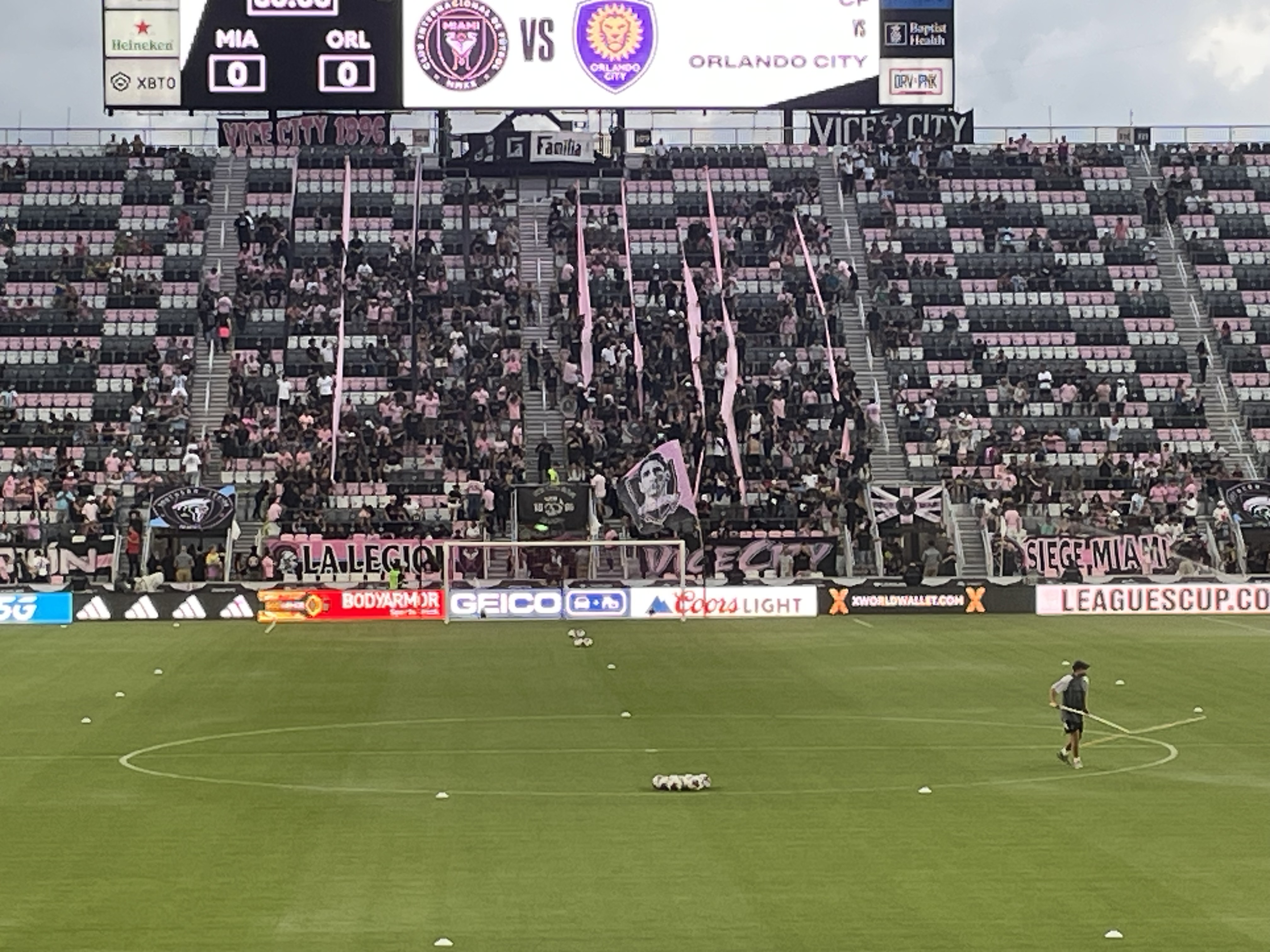
Supporter section at Chase Stadium with The Siege (Siege Miami) in the right and Vice City 1896 and Southern Legion (La Legion) in the middle

The club has four official supporters groups: The Siege, Southern Legion, Vice City 1896, and Nación Rosa Y Negro.

== Rivalries ==
The club has a rivalry with Orlando City, currently the team's closest neighbors and only other Florida-based team in MLS. Orlando City joined MLS in 2015 but had to wait until its sixth season to play a first intrastate match against an MLS opponent following the introduction of Inter Miami as an expansion franchise in 2020. It has been named the "Florida Derby" by the official MLS page.

The club also has an intracity rivalry in USL Championship club Miami FC. It is known as the "Miami Clásico".

== Honors ==
Domestic
Competitions	Titles	Seasons
MLS Cup	1	2025
Supporters' Shield	1	2024
Eastern Conference (Playoff)	1	2025
Eastern Conference (Regular Season)	1	2024
International
Competitions	Titles	Seasons
Leagues Cup	1^{s}	2023
Campeones Cup	1	2026

Notes

- record
- ^{s} shared record

== Players and staff ==
=== Current roster ===
As of September 14, 2026

Note: Flags indicate national team as defined under FIFA eligibility rules; some limited exceptions apply. Players may hold more than one non-FIFA nationality.

No.	Pos.	Nation	Player
2	DF	ARG	Gonzalo Luján
3	DF	ESP	Sergio Reguilón
4	DF	ARG	Facundo Mura
5	MF	BRA	Casemiro
7	MF	ARG	Rodrigo De Paul (DP)
8	MF	VEN	Telasco Segovia
9	FW	URU	Luis Suárez (vice-captain)
10	FW	ARG	Lionel Messi (captain; DP)
11	FW	BRA	Riquelme Fillipi
13	GK	USA	Luis Barraza
15	DF	ECU	Fricio Caicedo (on loan from Moravia FCM)
16	DF	BRA	Micael (on loan from Palmeiras)
17	DF	JAM	Ian Fray (HG)
19	FW	MEX	Germán Berterame (DP)
20	MF	USA	Santiago Morales (HG)
21	FW	ARG	Tadeo Allende

No.	Pos.	Nation	Player
22	MF	ARG	David Ayala
24	FW	ARG	Mateo Silvetti
26	DF	USA	Tyler Hall (HG)
34	GK	ARG	Rocco Ríos Novo
37	DF	URU	Maximiliano Falcón
42	MF	ITA	Yannick Bright
54	FW	HAI	Lovend's Delinois
56	FW	USA	Dániel Pintér (HG)
59	MF	USA	Preston Plambeck (HG)
62	DF	DOM	Israel Boatwright (HG)
70	DF	USA	Daniel Sumalla (HG)
76	DF	USA	Cesar Abadia (HG)
80	MF	PAR	Matías Galarza (on loan from River Plate)
88	MF	USA	Alexander Shaw (HG)
97	GK	CAN	Dayne St. Clair

=== Out on loan ===
Note: Flags indicate national team as defined under FIFA eligibility rules; some limited exceptions apply. Players may hold more than one non-FIFA nationality.

No.	Pos.	Nation	Player
6	DF	ARG	Tomás Avilés (on loan to O'Higgins)
32	DF	GRE	Noah Allen (HG; on loan to Chicago Fire)
41	MF	HON	David Ruiz (HG; on loan to New York Red Bulls)

=== Technical staff ===
As of September 15, 2026

Name	Position	Nationality
Kily González	Head coach	Argentina
Rafael Pérez	Assistant coach	Venezuela
Rodrigo Vargas	Assistant coach	Bolivia
Diter Alquiza	Goalkeeping coach	Bolivia
Sebastián Fabres	Fitness coach	Argentina
Javier Zerpa	Video analyst	Venezuela
Garrison Draper	Performance director	United States
Alberto Marrero	Sporting director	Spain
Niki Budalić	Director of soccer operations	Canada
Sam Gregory	Chief analyst	Canada
Xavier Asensi	President of business operations	Spain
Raul Sanllehi	President of football operations	Spain
Kieran Gibbs	Media director	England

=== Head coaches ===
As of October 28, 2026

Name	Nationality	Tenure	G	W	D	L	Win %
Diego Alonso	Uruguay	December 30, 2019 – January 7, 2021	24	7	3	14	29.17
Phil Neville	England	January 18, 2021 – June 1, 2023	90	35	13	42	38.89
Javier Morales (interim)	Argentina	June 1, 2023 – July 10, 2023	7	1	3	3	14.29
Gerardo Martino	Argentina	July 10, 2023 – November 22, 2024	67	35	16	16	52.24
Javier Mascherano	Argentina	November 26, 2024 – April 14, 2026	67	37	16	14	55.22
Guillermo Hoyos (interim)	Argentina	April 14, 2026 – September 14, 2026	21	10	6	5	47.62
Kily González	Argentina	September 15, 2026 – present	8	4	3	1	50.00

=== Club DP history ===
As of January 30, 2026

Player	Previous club	Years as DP
(Argentina) Matías Pellegrini	(Argentina) Estudiantes	2020
(Mexico) Rodolfo Pizarro	(Mexico) Monterrey	2020–2023
(Argentina) Gonzalo Higuaín	(Italy) Juventus	2020–2022
(France) Blaise Matuidi	(Italy) Juventus	2021
(Brazil) Gregore	(Brazil) Bahia	2021–2023
(Spain) Alejandro Pozuelo	(Canada) Toronto FC	2022
(Ecuador) Leonardo Campana	(England) Wolverhampton Wanderers	2023–2024
(Argentina) Lionel Messi	(France) Paris Saint-Germain	2023–
(Spain) Sergio Busquets	(Spain) Barcelona	2023–2025
(Spain) Jordi Alba	(Spain) Barcelona	2025
(Argentina) Rodrigo De Paul	(Spain) Atlético Madrid	2026–
(Mexico) Germán Berterame	(Mexico) Monterrey	2026–

== Records ==
=== Seasons ===
Season	League										Position		Playoffs	USOC	Continental / Other		Average attendance (Note: Average attendance only includes statistics from regular season matches.)	Top goalscorer(s) (Note: Top goalscorer(s) includes all goals scored in the regular season, MLS Cup Playoffs, U.S. Open Cup, MLS is Back Tournament, CONCACAF Champions League, FIFA Club World Cup, and other competitive continental matches.)	
Season	League	Pld	W	L	D	GF	GA	GD	Pts	PPG	Conf.	Overall	Playoffs	USOC	Continental / Other		Average attendance	Name(s)	Goals
2020	MLS	23	7	13	3	25	35	–10	24	1.04	10th	19th	PR	NH	MLS is Back Tournament	GS	2,216	(Scotland) Lewis Morgan	5
2021	MLS	34	12	17	5	36	53	–17	41	1.21	11th	20th	–	NH			14,713	(Argentina) Gonzalo Higuaín	12
2022	MLS	34	14	14	6	47	56	–9	48	1.41	6th	12th	R1	Ro16			12,613	(Argentina) Gonzalo Higuaín	16
2023	MLS	34	9	18	7	41	54	–13	34	1.00	14th	27th	–	RU	Leagues Cup	W	17,698	(Venezuela) Josef Martínez	12
2024	MLS	34	22	4	8	79	49	30	74	2.18	1st	1st	R1	DNE	CONCACAF Champions Cup Leagues Cup	QF Ro16	21,245	(Uruguay) Luis Suárez	25
2025	MLS	34	19	7	8	81	55	26	65	1.91	3rd	3rd	W	DNE	CONCACAF Champions Cup FIFA Club World Cup Leagues Cup	SF Ro16 RU	20,746	(Argentina) Lionel Messi	43
Total		193	83	73	37	309	302	7	286	1.48	—	—	—	—	—		—	(Argentina) Lionel Messi	77

== Infrastructure ==
=== Reserve team ===
On October 9, 2019, the club announced that they were fielding a reserve team in the third tier of US Soccer, USL League One. This team allows the club to prepare future players with quality competition in hopes of being called up to the first team. The unnamed League One Miami team will train at the training facilities of Chase Stadium.

The team was to open their inaugural season on March 27, 2020, against Union Omaha at the Inter Miami Stadium, but the match was postponed due to the COVID-19 pandemic.

On February 24, 2022, Fort Lauderdale announced that the team had rebranded as Inter Miami II ahead of their move to the MLS Next Pro, the new reserve league for MLS teams.

=== Academy ===
The Inter Miami Academy is the official youth academy and development system of Inter Miami that was established in 2019. The academy consists of various levels of age groups, ranging from under-12 to under-17. These teams will also train at the training grounds at Inter Miami stadium alongside their MLS and USL League One counterparts. All of Inter Miami's youth teams compete in the MLS Next soccer league as of the inaugural 2022 season. The system covers the under-12, under-13, under-14, under-15, and under-17 age groups.

== Media ==
The team's first three matches in the 2020 season were assigned to national broadcasts; a broadcast deal was not announced before the suspension of play due to the COVID-19 pandemic, but the team did announce that Ray Hudson would serve as color commentator, Andres Cordero served as the play-by-play commentator, joined by Fernando Fiore as the host, and Kaylyn Kyle as the sideline reporter. On April 3, 2020, the club announced a regional English-language television deal with CBS Television Stations, under which its regional matches will air on MyNetworkTV affiliate WBFS-TV, with selected matches airing on CBS station WFOR-TV. Then on April 30, the club announced a Spanish rights deal with Univision, where games would be aired on its TV affiliate WAMI and radio affiliate WQBA, with a broadcast team consisting of Ramses Sandoval, Luis Omar Tapia, Daniel Nohra, Diego Balado, Nicholas Cantor and Tony Cherchi. On February 23, 2023, Inter Miami named Kieran Gibbs as the media director for the team and its network. Heineken is also the official beer of Inter Miami along with partnership or sponsorship made on August 6, 2019. Inter Miami has many partnerships and sponsorships with certain well known companies of United States or internationally. Inter Miami announced a multi-year partnership, with battery brand Duracell as its official power partner on February 15, 2024. Inter Miami formally announced the renewal of its partnership with prominent, global cryptofinance firm XBTO on Tuesday March 12, 2024. The multi-year extension sees XBTO remain as Inter Miami CF's Official Cryptofinance Partner. In May 2024, Inter Miami announced a premium multi-year international partnership with Visa.

All of Major League Soccer's regional television contracts expired after the 2023 season, with all television coverage moving to MLS Season Pass on Apple TV.

== See also ==
- List of most expensive association football transfers
- List of most expensive American soccer transfers
- Forbes list of the most valuable football clubs
- Forbes list of the most valuable sports teams
- Designated Player Rule
- Sports in Miami
