= Jorge Mas Canosa =

Cuban-American businessman and lobbyist (1939–1997)

- Mas Canosa speaking to press at Miami International Airport after the 1996 Brothers to the Rescue shootdown
- Born: September 21, 1939; Santiago de Cuba, Cuba
- Died: November 23, 1997 (aged 58); Coral Gables, Florida, US
- Spouse: Irma Santos
- Children: 3, including Jorge Mas

Jorge Lincoln Mas Canosa (21 September 1939 – 24 November 1997) was a Cuban-American businessman who founded the Cuban American National Foundation and MasTec, a publicly traded company. Regarded within the United States as a powerful lobbyist on Cuban and anti-Castro political positions, he was labeled a "counterrevolutionary" by the Cuban Communist Party.

Mas Canosa was the driving force behind the creation of both Radio Marti and TV Marti and was appointed chairman of the advisory panel by President Ronald Reagan. In the early 1960s, he was trained by the CIA for the Bay of Pigs Invasion and was commissioned as a second lieutenant in the United States Army. Under his leadership, the Cuban-American National Foundation received criticism for its role in covert operations in Cuba. In 1998, The New York Times published several articles on Mas Canosa's relation and financial support of Luis Posada Carriles, an anti-communist Cuban exile declared as a terrorist by both USA's Federal Bureau of Investigation (FBI) and the Government of Cuba (among other organizations who also declared Posada Carriles a terrorist).

== Biography ==
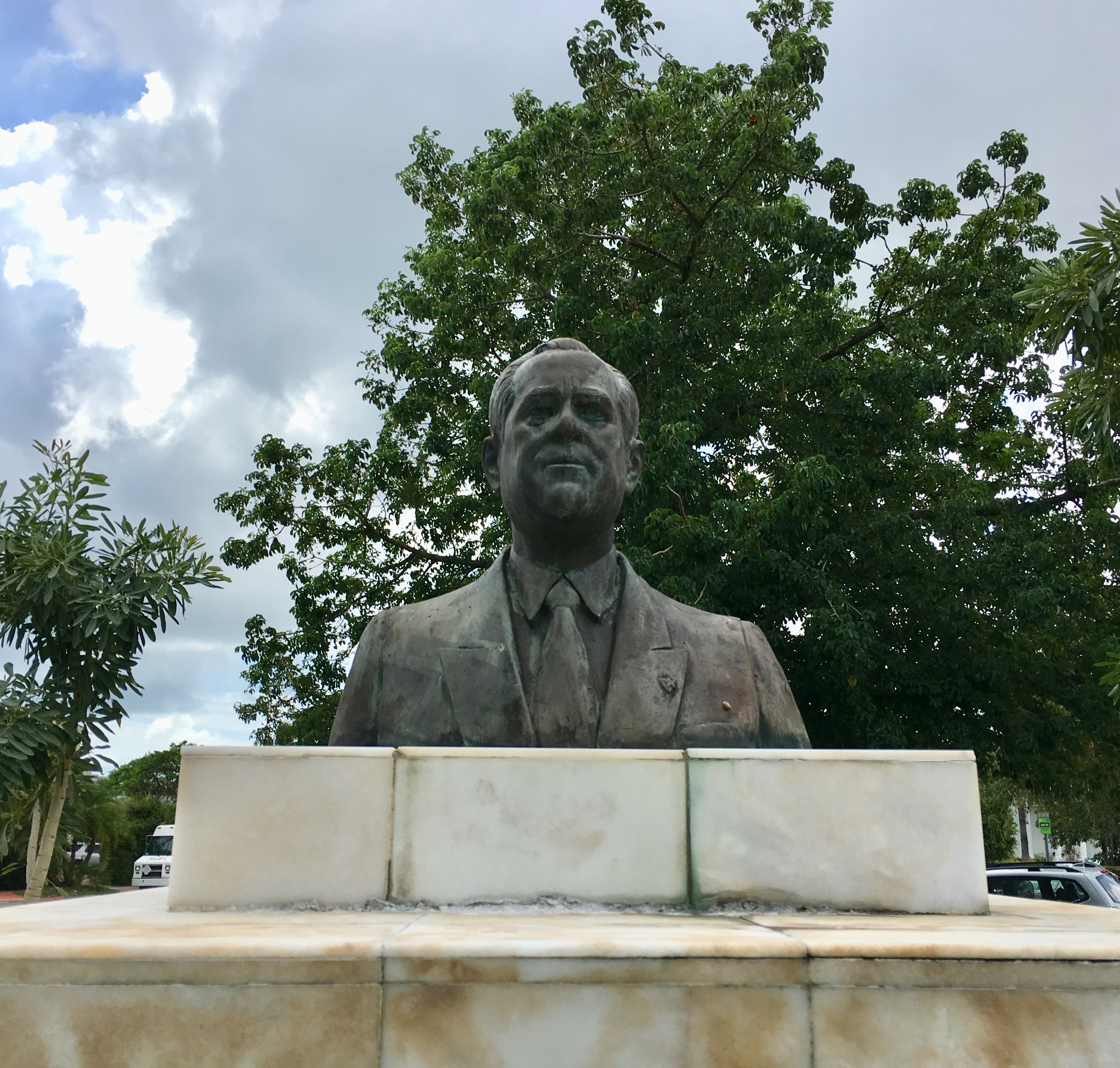
Bust of Jorge Mas Canosa in Miami Beach, Florida, November 2019

Jorge Mas Canosa was born and raised in Santiago de Cuba, Cuba on September 21, 1939. He was the son of Ramón Emilio Mas Cayado and Josefa del Carmen Canosa Aguilera. At age fourteen, Mas was arrested for his role in an anti-Batista radio broadcast. Mas Canosa was sent by his father to the United States where he studied at Presbyterian Junior College in Maxton, North Carolina. He returned to Cuba in 1959 a week after Castro seized power, and briefly attended law school at Oriente University. Not long after his return to Cuba, he was implicated in antigovernment activities by the Castro regime and arrested for plastering anti-Castro stickers on buildings.

In 1960, he fled Cuba for the United States and settled in Miami, Florida, where he joined the Cuban exile force being trained by the Central Intelligence Agency to launch the April 1961 Bay of Pigs invasion. During the invasion, Mas Canosa's boat was held offshore and after a short time in the United States Army, he left the army.

After the army, Mas Canosa held blue-collar jobs, washed dishes and delivered milk to support his family. In the early 1960s Mas Canosa was deeply involved with the CIA-backed group RECE (Cuban Representation in Exile), and, according to his brother Ricardo, its military arm, CORU (Commandos of the United Revolutionary Organizations), an alliance of twenty men of the most extreme anti-Castro groups run by dedicated militants such as Orlando Bosch, Luis Posada Carriles and Ignacio and Guillermo Novo. The New York Times reported that he devoted his time to the anti-Castro movement and raised money to obtain weapons and research locations in the Caribbean which could be used as a base for attacks on Cuba. In 1961, he married Irma Santos, his highschool sweetheart from Santiago. Mas Canosa also worked as a broadcaster at Radio Swan, a CIA anti Castro propaganda station, under the tutelage of David Atlee Phillips. Through his connections with RECE, Mas Canosa met Ignacio Iglesias and Hector Torres and joined their telephone cable company Iglesias & Torres in 1968.

In 1971, he acquired the firm for $50,000 and translated the former name into the English form Church & Tower. The organization would go on to become the foundation of a telecommunications empire and multinational corporation MasTec. Mr. Mas would become one of the wealthiest Hispanic businessmen in the United States, with a net worth of over $100 million at the time of his death. In 1981, Mas Canosa and Raul Masvidal established the non-profit Cuban American National Foundation (CANF). Throughout his leadership of the organization, Canosa and CANF held immense influence over the U.S policy with Cuba. Congressman Robert Torricelli credited Mas Canosa with aiding him in the design of the 1994 Cuban Democracy Act and the Helms-Burton Act.

During the Iran–Contra affair, the name Jorge Mas and four phone numbers (including Mas Canosa's private home line) were found in the notes of Oliver North. Mas Canosa suggested that Oliver North was referring to another Jorge Mas and denied ever providing money to North. Mas said he only met North once, in either late 1984 or early 1985, during a White House visit. However, North's notebook refers to a Jorge Mas a number of times. Mas Canosa's friend Félix Rodríguez confirmed at a Senate hearing in 1988 that he was given $50,000 from Mas Canosa to pass on to Oliver North. Throughout his life, Mas Canosa was involved in several highly publicized lawsuits and personal feuds. In 1986, Mr. Mas challenged City Commissioner Joe Carollo, to a duel on a field of honor at an undisclosed place in Central America. Mr. Carollo agreed, but only with water pistols. Later in 1990 a Dade County jury found that Mas Canosa had libeled his own brother, Ricardo, and ordered him to pay $900,000.

In 1996, Jorge Mas Canosa debated Ricardo Alarcón who at the time was the leader of the Cuban National Assembly of Popular Power. The debate was broadcast on CBS-TeleNoticias and both participants answered questions from journalists and responded to each other's comments. A question was posed to see if the two would support each other if a democratic election was held in Cuba. Mas Canosa responded in the affirmative:"Yes sir, if Mr. Alarcón won in a free and democratic election - one that allows political parties and access to mass communication - we would support him." Alarcón said no with his reasoning being "Because he's not Cuban." In an interview with the Los Angeles Times, Mas Canosa was asked if he has assimilated and responded: “I have never assimilated. I never intended to. I am a Cuban first. I live here only as an extension of Cuba. I live a Cuban life here. My friends, my social activities, they are all Cuban.”

Mas Canosa died in Miami on November 24, 1997, from lung cancer, compounded by pleurisy and renal failure. His funeral was attended by thousands of mourners and many prominent politicians such as Sen. Robert G. Torricelli who gave a eulogy.

== Cuba ==
=== Cuban American National Foundation ===
In 1981, Mas Canosa, along with Raul Masvidal and Carlos Salman, established the Cuban American National Foundation (CANF), at the suggestion of Richard Allen, Ronald Reagan's National Security Advisor, and Mario Elgarresta, a member of Allen's staff. The group was founded as part of a broader strategy to sideline more moderate perspectives within the Cuban-American community, and to convert anti-Castro activism from a more militant to a more political strategy. CANF was widely described during Mas Canosa's tenure as one of the most powerful ethnic lobbying organizations in the US, and used campaign contributions to advance its policy in Washington, DC. Carter administration officials believed that if not for Mas Canosa, the United States might have ended the Cuban embargo. Mas Canosa has received criticism from prominent journalists such as Christopher Hitchens who called Mas Canosa the caudillo of the Cuban-American National Foundation.

=== Relationship with Luis Posada Carriles ===
CIA records from the National Security archive reveal that Mas Canosa paid Luis Posada Carriles, $5000 to cover the expenses of a demolition operation in Mexico. According to Luis Posada Carriles, in 1985, Mas Canosa financed Carriles's escape from a prison of maximum security in Venezuela, where he was imprisoned for being the intellectual author of the explosion of a Cuban airliner that resulted in the death of 73 civilians.

== Business ==
=== Iglesias & Torres ===
In 1969, Mas Canosa went into business with the owners of Iglesias y Torres, a floundering and overextended construction firm that constructed and serviced telephone networks in Puerto Rico. Renaming the company Church & Tower, Mas Canosa obtained a $50,000 loan and became a part owner. Managing Miami operations, he used his growing reputation in the exile community to secure lines of credit and was ultimately able to optimize his workers' construction methods and increase the company's productivity. The company grew from South Miami to Ft. Lauderdale with $40 million in annual revenues in 1980. Church & Tower became the basis for a telecommunications empire that made Mas Canosa one of the richest Hispanic businessmen in the United States; his net worth was estimated at more than $100 million when he died in 1997.

=== MasTec ===
Following the incorporation of Mas Canosa's sons into the business became MasTec, Inc. in 1994 when Jorge Mas led a reverse acquisition by its former competitor, Burnup & Sims. As of 2015, MasTec, Inc. (NYSE:MTZ) is a $4.2 billion revenue infrastructure construction company with approximately 15,900 employees and 470 locations. MasTec is a leader in six distinct business lines. Power Generation and Industrial renewable, Natural Gas and Oil Pipeline, Electrical Transmission, Wireless, Wireline Utility Services and DirecTV install to the home.

== Media involvement ==
=== Radio and television Martí ===
In the early 1980s, Mas Canosa urged President Ronald Reagan to create a radio station aimed at broadcasting news into Cuba. After the station (named Radio Martí, after José Martí) was created, Reagan named Mas Canosa chair of the advisory board of the Office of Cuba Broadcasting, which advised the president on the operation of the station. Station employees later accused Mas Canosa of interfering with station content, including accusations that he had complained that the stations did not give enough coverage to his personal activities.

=== New Republic lawsuit ===
Mas Canosa sued The New Republic for libel after a 1994 article in the magazine referred to him as a "mobster". The case settled out of court for $100,000, and the magazine issued an apology for the title which was chosen without participation of the author of the article Ann Louise Bardach. After the settlement, The New Republic still stands behind the article itself, stating that nothing in the article requires clarification, correction or apology as nothing in it has been proven false or libelous.

=== Miami Herald feud ===
Mas Canosa repeatedly feuded with the Miami Herald, which he claimed had Cuban spies among its reporting staff. He accused the paper of fermenting "hate, disinformation and reckless disregard" of the Miami Cuban community. In 1992, after the Herald editorialized against the Torricelli Bill he supported, and the newspaper's Spanish-language Nuevo Herald wrote an editorial critical of him, he organized a boycott of the newspaper and posted advertisements on city buses which announced: "I don't believe The Miami Herald". David Lawrence Jr., the Herald's publisher, ran a lengthy column defending the paper under the headline "Please Mr. Mas, Be Fair." The Herald was inundated with bomb and death threats and some of its vending machines were smeared with excrement. After several months, a truce was called at a Miami luncheon where Mas Canosa mocked Lawrence's strained Spanish.

== Legacy ==
=== Jorge Mas Canosa Middle School ===
He is the namesake for a middle school in Miami-Dade County, Florida, which opened in August 2007.

=== Freedom Tower ===
In 1997, Mas Canosa purchased the Freedom Tower in Miami for $4.2 million.
