= MasTec =

Infrastructure and construction company

Coordinates: 25.763969°N 80.256220°W

MasTec, Inc.
- Formerly: Burnip & Sims Inc;
- Type: Public
- Traded as: NYSE: MTZ; S&P 400 Component
- Industry: Heavy construction Engineering; Project management
- Founded: March 11, 1994; 32 years ago
- Founder: Jorge Mas Canosa
- Headquarters: Coral Gables, Florida, U.S.
- Area served: North America
- Key people: Jose Mas, CEO
- Products: Oil and natural gas pipelines, electricity generation, transmission and distribution, renewable energy, wireless and wireline communications, broadband
- Revenue: ▲US$ 14.299 billion (2025)
- Net income: ▲US$ 422.0 million (2025)
- Total assets: ▲US$ 9.924 billion (2025)
- Owner: Jorge and Jose Mas (21%)
- Number of employees: 36,000 (2025)
- Website: mastec.com

Mastec, Inc. is an American infrastructure engineering and construction company based in Coral Gables, Florida. The company provides engineering, building, installation, maintenance and upgrade of energy, utility and communications infrastructure. Its customers are primarily in the utility, communications and government industries.

The company was founded in March 1994 by Jorge Mas Canosa, father of MasTec's current chief executive officer Jose Mas. The company was listed on the New York Stock Exchange in 1998. MasTec, Inc. is the second largest Hispanic-owned company in the United States with over 20,000 employees in North America.

== History ==
=== Early 1900s: Beginning as Burnup & Sims ===
The company was formed by the merger of two separate companies: Burnup & Sims and Church & Tower. Burnup & Sims was the oldest of the two founding companies and was founded in 1929 by two unemployed carpenters, Russell Burnup and Riley V. Sims, to provide design, construction, and maintenance services to the telephone and utilities industries. During the years of the Great Depression, the two established an office in West Palm Beach, Florida, and by 1936, had a small fleet of trucks and staff. The company's first telecommunications projects were undertaken the following year at Cape Canaveral, where it was responsible for burying 85 miles of cable.

B&S contributed to national defense during World War II by building airfields and telephone systems. After the war, the company became involved in the laying of underwater cable from Florida to Puerto Rico, and from there to Barbados, for such companies as AT&T and General Telephone. Projects then took on a greater geographical scope, as B&S established underground telecommunications systems and built radio towers in Costa Rica, Barbados, Trinidad-Tobago, and Venezuela.

=== 1960s: Church & Tower is formed ===
Founded in Cuba, Church & Tower incorporated in Miami, Florida, in 1968 to construct and service telephone networks in Puerto Rico and Miami. When it overextended itself in Puerto Rico and could not build the telephone-infrastructure networks needed in Miami, the company's owner asked his friend, Cuban immigrant Jorge Mas Canosa, to help save the business. In exchange for half ownership of CTF, Mas Canosa began to manage the company in 1969. Eager to improve the business, Mas Canosa climbed down into ditches, manholes, and trenches to observe workers’ construction methods. He listened to advice from telephone-companies and government inspectors; he studied books about the most efficient and newest construction methods. BellSouth Telecommunications, Inc. awarded Church & Tower a long-term contract for projects in the greater Miami and Fort Lauderdale areas. By 1971, Mas Canosa had turned the failing company around; he then borrowed $50,000 and bought the remaining shares of the firm.

=== 1990s: Founding of MasTec ===
On March 11, 1994, Church & Tower Group acquired 65 percent of the outstanding common stock of publicly traded Burnup & Sims, Inc. The name of Burnup & Sims was changed to MasTec, Inc., Jorge Mas Canosa became MasTec's chairman and his son, Jorge Mas, was named president and chief executive officer. Mastec was now regarded as a “minority business enterprise,” publicly traded on NASDAQ under the symbol MTZ.

=== 21st century ===
In April 2007, Jose Mas became CEO of MasTec. MasTec, Inc. earned total revenues of $3B in 2011 and, in addition to the MasTec brand, works under the following brand names: Wanzek, Power Partners, Precision Pipeline, Pumpco, nsoro, Advanced Technologies, ADVent, EC Source, Fabcor, Cam Communications, 3 PhaseLine, Optima Network Services, White Construction, and Globetec.

During 2024, MasTec completed three acquisitions. These included a construction company specializing in underground utility infrastructure and datacenter utility systems, a heavy civil contractor focused on transportation projects, and a company specializing in pipeline infrastructure and heavy civil projects. MasTec said the acquisitions were intended to expand its capabilities in datacenter, heavy civil, and pipeline infrastructure.

MasTec completed several smaller acquisitions during 2025, including companies involved in telecommunications construction, roadway infrastructure, construction management and design-build services, and home installation services. The aggregate purchase price of these acquisitions consisted of approximately $87 million in cash, net of cash acquired, together with an earn-out liability valued at $13 million.

2026 acquisitions
Closing date	Acquisition	Announced terms
July 20, 2026	The Superior Group	US$1.65 billion in cash and stock, subject to adjustments, plus a potential earnout
November 20, 2026	Murphy Corporation	US$1.25 billion in cash, subject to adjustments, plus a potential earnout

== Executives ==
Jorge Mas is the current chairman of the board for MasTec, and former CEO. He served as CEO from 1992 to 1997, and is the brother of current CEO, Jose Mas.
Jose Mas is the CEO of MasTec. He was appointed in 2007.
Robert Apple has been COO since 2006. Formerly, he was group president for MasTec's energy service operations.
Paul DiMarco has been executive vice president and CFO since April 1, 2023.
Alberto de Cardenas is executive vice president and general counsel; he has been responsible for all of MasTec's corporate and operational legal matters and corporate secretary matters since 2005.

== Industries ==
=== Renewable energy ===
In the renewable energy sector, MasTec is a contractor that constructs wind farms, solar energy facilities and power plants. Through their wholly owned subsidiary, Wanzek Construction, MasTec has built several wind farms, including Clipper Wind Farm in Jefferson, Minnesota; Taloga Wind Farm, in Putnam, Oklahoma; Crow Lake Wind Farm, in White Lake, South Dakota; Goat Mountain Wind Farm, in Robert Lee, Texas; and Laredo Ridge, in Boone County, Nebraska. Solar Energy projects include Douglas County Schools, in Denver, Colorado, where photo voltaic panels were installed onto 31 rooftops, and the Willows, California, Solar Project. MasTec also designed and built the Cornhusker Energy Power Plant, in Lexington, Nebraska. MasTec Power Corp. is another wholly owned subsidiary providing renewable energy Engineering, procurement, and construction management (EPC) services for a variety of fuel types.

=== Electric power ===
In the Electric Power Industry, MasTec is a contractor that builds and maintains high voltage electric power transmission systems, sub stations and switch yards, and distribution systems. Through their subsidiaries Wanzek Construction and MasTec Power Corp., MasTec is capable of providing design-build, EPC, and construction services for a variety of clients in the utility and private power producing markets.

=== Oil and natural gas ===
MasTec builds pipelines for the transportation of crude oil and natural gas. They also build pumping stations, compressor stations, and treatment facilities where oil and natural gas are conditioned before transporting to market.

=== Water and sewer ===
In the water distribution and waste industry, MasTec builds water and waste water pipelines for municipalities throughout Florida and the Caribbean Islands.

=== Communications ===
MasTec's original line of business was in the communications industry, constructing transmission lines and digging trenches for companies like Bell South in Florida. Now, MasTec is a major contractor for wireless networks and broadband, as well. They construct and maintain radio towers for mobile phone carriers, and do the trenching required to install fiber optic cable. Under its subsidiary MasTec Advanced Technologies, the company is also one of the largest providers of in-home installation of DirecTV in the United States and installing residential security systems for AT&T Digital Life.

== Projects ==
=== Craw-Kan Telephone Line ===
The Craw-Kan Telephone Line is in southeast Kansas. MasTec installed 962 miles of transmission line.

=== North Valley Transmission Line ===
The North Valley Transmission Line is a 500/250 high voltage transmission line in Pinnacle Peak, Arizona. The services they provided included setting foundations, erecting steel poles, and installing conductor wire.

=== Puerto Rico power grid rebuild ===
In June 2018, MasTec was awarded a $500M one-year contract for the restoration, reconstruction and modernization of Puerto Rico's still-vulnerable power grid, damaged in September 2017 by the powerful Hurricane Maria.

=== Ruby Pipeline ===
The Ruby Pipeline is a 42-inch (1,100 mm) natural gas pipeline running from Opal, Wyoming, to Malin, Oregon. The route crosses Northern Utah, and Northern Nevada. Ruby Pipeline, L.L.C. filed an application with the Federal Energy Regulatory Commission (FERC) on January 27, 2009, authorizing the construction and operation of the Ruby Pipeline Project. On April 5, 2010, the FERC approved the application. Construction began on July 31, 2010, and the pipeline was placed in service on July 28, 2011. The pipe is 680 miles (1,090 km) long and is expected to output 1.5 billion cubic feet per day (42×106 m3/d). MasTec, and its subsidiary Precision Pipeline, was awarded spreads 4 and 5 of the Ruby Pipeline Project, including the fabrication of mainline valves, launchers and receivers and associated foundations in the spring of 2010. An automatic welding process was used to install the 256 miles of 42" pipeline.

=== Taloga Wind Farm ===
The Taloga Wind Farm was constructed in 2011 and is located near Putnam, Oklahoma. The project produces an estimated 324GW.h of power annually and consists of 54 Mitsubishi MWT95 2.4MW turbines and over 20 miles of transmission line. During construction, MasTec employees volunteered their time and efforts to clean up a nearby lake. Thirty-seven MasTec employees walked the 63 mile shoreline surrounding Foss Lake and removed eight large dumpsters of trash.

=== Willows Solar Power Facility ===
MasTec completed the Willows, California, solar power facility in May 2011. The 380kv system consists of 58 Dual Axis trackers with 24 PV Modules mounted to each tracker. The system will provide power to the city's waste water treatment plant.
