= AT&T Digital Life =

Home security & automation services

AT&T Digital Life, Inc.
- Type: Subsidiary
- Industry: Home Security; Home Automation
- Founded: 2012; 14 years ago
- Defunct: September 1, 2022; 4 years ago
- Headquarters: Dallas, Texas
- Area served: United States
- Key people: Kevin Petersen (SVP)
- Products: Home Security; Home Automation; Internet of Things
- Parent: AT&T Communications
- Website: attdigitallife.com

AT&T Digital Life, Inc., headquartered in Dallas, Texas, was a maker of Wireless home security systems with burglary and fire monitoring for homes and apartments in the United States. Digital Life services are no longer supported starting September 1, 2022.

== Since 2022 ==
AT&T Digital Life was discontinued in 2022. Users were given the option to switch to Brinks Home security with upgraded cameras and a touchpad. Users were also allowed to keep their current equipment and use it until the final day of service.

== Residential Security ==
AT&T Digital Life's home security systems consisted of security and automation equipment and 24/7 monitoring.

=== Products ===
Each user was able to customize the AT&T Digital Life wireless system to fit their home. AT&T Digital Life offered packages, and with a basic system, users could add extra sensors, video cameras, motion sensors, or other devices. AT&T Digital Life users were able to add additional AT&T Digital Life devices to the system at any time. AT&T Digital Life wireless home security systems were also available to renters and homeowners.

=== Services ===
24/7 Professional Monitoring, Video Monitoring, Remote Door Locks, Lighting and Thermostat Control, Water Detection and Fire and Carbon Monoxide Monitoring.

=== Mobile Access ===
Users were able to get use of mobile access to arm, disarm and control the AT&T Digital Life security system. Mobile access was able to be used to arm and disarm the system, view video from security cameras, monitor sensors, lock and unlock doors, and turn off devices utilizing smart plugs.
