= Jorge Mas =

American businessman

Jorge Mas Santos
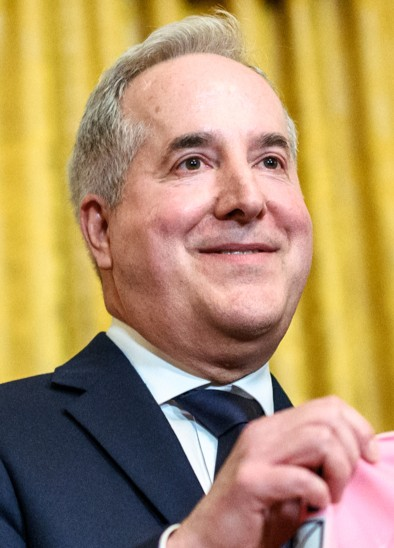
- Mas in 2026
- Born: February 28, 1963 (age 63); Miami, Florida, U.S.
- Education: University of Miami (BBA and MBA)
- Occupations: Chairman of Cuban American National Foundation; Chairman of MasTec; Managing owner of Inter Miami; President of Real Zaragoza
- Spouse: Aleyda Mas
- Children: 3
- Parent(s): Jorge Mas Canosa; Irma Santos
- Website: jmcff.org

Jorge Mas Santos (born February 28, 1963) is an American billionaire businessman and the chairman and largest shareholder of MasTec, a Miami-based construction and engineering company, founded by his father Jorge Mas Canosa.

Mas is also chairman of the Cuban American National Foundation and managing owner of Inter Miami, a Miami-based Major League Soccer team. He is also president of Real Zaragoza, a Spanish football club. As of April 2022, his net worth was estimated at US$1.0 billion.

== Education ==
Mas attended and graduated from the University of Miami, where he obtained a bachelor's degree in business administration in 1984 and a master's degree in business administration in 1985 from the University of Miami School of Business.

== Career ==
Mas is the chairman of MasTec (NYSE:MTZ), a company founded by his father. He began his career at Church and Tower, MasTec's predecessor, in 1984.

In 1990, Mas co-founded Neff Corporation (NYSE:NFF) a provider of rental construction and utility equipment. In 2005, it was sold for a reported $510 million.

He is the managing partner of a private equity group with investments in the fields of aviation, banking, commercial real estate, healthcare, and fixed income trading market makers.

== Cuban American National Foundation ==
Mas is chairman of the Cuban American National Foundation (CANF), founded by his father in 1981. Mas has taken a more moderate position on Cuba than did his father, a vehement opponent of Castro.

== Personal life ==
He is married to Aleyda. They have three children and reside in Miami.
