= 2025 San Diego FC season =

San Diego FC 2025 soccer season

San Diego FC
2025 season
- General manager: Tyler Heaps
- Head coach: Mikey Varas
- Stadium: Snapdragon Stadium
- Major League Soccer: Conference: 1st Overall: 4th
- MLS Cup playoffs: Conference finals
- Leagues Cup: League stage
- Top goalscorer: League: Anders Dreyer (19); All: Anders Dreyer (23)
- Highest home attendance: 34,506 vs. St. Louis (Mar. 1)
- Lowest home attendance: 22,361 vs. Colorado (May 14)
- Average home league attendance: 28,064
- Biggest win: 5–0 vs. FC Dallas (May 3)
- Biggest defeat: 0–3 at Charlotte FC (Apr. 10)
| Home colors | Away colors |

The 2025 season was the first season for San Diego FC in Major League Soccer (MLS), the top flight of professional club soccer in the United States. San Diego FC was announced as an expansion team on May 18, 2023, under the ownership of Egyptian businessman Mohamed Mansour and the Sycuan Band of the Kumeyaay Nation, a local indigenous tribe. The team played their home matches at Snapdragon Stadium, which it shared with San Diego Wave FC of the National Women's Soccer League (NWSL) and the San Diego State Aztecs football team.

Former FC Dallas and United States men's national team assistant coach Mikey Varas was hired as the club's first head coach on September 16, 2024. The 2024 MLS expansion draft took place on December 11, 2024, and allowed San Diego FC to select players from other MLS teams based on eligibility requirements. The team also received the first pick in the 2025 MLS SuperDraft, which took place on December 20, 2024.

The first San Diego FC players, including Designated Player and Mexican forward Hirving "Chucky" Lozano, were sent on loan until they joined the club in January 2025. The club used players from the international Right to Dream academy system and other teams owned by Mansour, including FC Nordsjælland. The first regular season match for San Diego FC was played on February 23 against the LA Galaxy; the team's first home match was March 1 against St. Louis City SC.

== Summary ==
=== Preseason ===
The first training sessions for San Diego FC opened on January 13, 2025, two days after the start of the preseason camp. The team practiced at their new training facility, the Sharp HealthCare Performance Center, with most of their expected 2025 roster.

The club's first preseason matches were played behind closed doors against Phoenix Rising FC and Sacramento Republic FC, both from the second-division USL Championship. San Diego FC played in the 2025 Coachella Valley Invitational in February at the Empire Polo Club in Indio, California, and was joined by sister club San Diego Wave FC of the National Women's Soccer League. The team lost 3–1 to New York City FC in their first public exhibition match with an opening goal by Paddy McNair and three unanswered from NYCFC. San Diego FC then lost 3–0 to the Portland Timbers but defeated the New York Red Bulls 6–0 in their final preseason match, which was played with their full starting roster. Members of the team's supporters groups traveled to Indio for the matches.

=== Regular season ===
On February 21, San Diego FC played their inaugural match on the road against the LA Galaxy, the defending MLS Cup champions, at Dignity Health Sports Park in Carson, California. They won 2–0 in an upset against the Galaxy with two goals scored by Anders Dreyer; the crowd included an estimated 1,000 San Diego FC supporters who had traveled for the match. The team made their debut at Snapdragon Stadium on March 1 and hosted St. Louis City SC in front of a stadium-record crowd of 34,506. The match finished in a 0–0 draw and was marred by the use of a homophobic chant that was condemned by the club and coach Mikey Varas; midfielder Hirving Lozano left early in the first half with a hamstring injury.

== Preseason results ==
| January 25 | San Diego FC | v | Phoenix Rising FC | San Diego, California |
| TBD PST | | | | Stadium: Sharp HealthCare Performance Center |
Note: Result not published.

| February 1 | San Diego FC | v | Sacramento Republic FC | San Diego, California |
| TBD PST | | | | Stadium: Sharp HealthCare Performance Center |
Note: Result not published.

| February 8 CVI | San Diego FC | 1–3 | New York City FC | Indio, California |
| 12:00 pm PST | McNair 19'; Alvarado (yellow card) 35'; Tverskov (yellow card) 61'; Diop (yellow card) 73' | Report | Martinez 28', 65'; Bakrar 39'; Romero (yellow card) 88' | Stadium: Empire Polo Club |

| February 12 CVI | Portland Timbers | 3–0 | San Diego FC | Indio, California |
| 1:30 pm PST | Mora 14', 84'; Guerra 80' | Report | | Stadium: Empire Polo Club |

| February 15 CVI | San Diego FC | 6–0 | New York Red Bulls | Indio, California |
| 10:00 am PST | Dreyer 8', 61'; Lozano 17', (yellow card) 50'; de la Torre (yellow card) 39', (goal) 40'; Godoy (yellow card) 50'; Ingvartsen 64'; Boateng 90' (pen.) | Report | Valencia (yellow card) 34'; Eile (yellow card) 52' | Stadium: Empire Polo Club |

== Competitions ==
=== Major League Soccer ===
==== Standings ====
MLS Western Conference table (2025)
| Pos | Team | Pld | W | L | T | GF | GA | GD | Pts | Qualification |
|---|---|---|---|---|---|---|---|---|---|---|
| 1 | San Diego FC | 34 | 19 | 9 | 6 | 64 | 41 | +23 | 63 | Qualification for round one and the CONCACAF Champions Cup round one |
| 2 | Vancouver Whitecaps FC | 34 | 18 | 7 | 9 | 66 | 38 | +28 | 63 | Qualification for round one |
| 3 | Los Angeles FC | 34 | 17 | 8 | 9 | 65 | 40 | +25 | 60 | Qualification for round one |
| 4 | Minnesota United FC | 34 | 16 | 8 | 10 | 56 | 39 | +17 | 58 | Qualification for round one |
| 5 | Seattle Sounders FC | 34 | 15 | 9 | 10 | 58 | 48 | +10 | 55 | Qualification for round one |

Source: MLS
Rules for classification: 1) points; 2) total wins; 3) total goal differential; 4) total goals scored; 5) fewer disciplinary points; 6) away goal differential; 7) away goals scored; 8) home goals differential; 9) home goals scored; 10) coin toss (2 clubs tied) or drawing of lots (≥3 clubs tied)

==== Results summary ====
| Overall | | | | | | | | Home | | | | | | Away | | | | | |
| Pld | W | D | L | GF | GA | GD | Pts | W | D | L | GF | GA | GD | W | D | L | GF | GA | GD |
|---|---|---|---|---|---|---|---|---|---|---|---|---|---|---|---|---|---|---|---|
| 34 | 19 | 6 | 9 | 64 | 41 | +23 | 63 | 7 | 5 | 5 | 25 | 17 | +8 | 12 | 1 | 4 | 39 | 24 | +15 |

Last updated: Complete.
Source: MLS

Results by matchday
| Matchday | 1 | 2 | 3 | 4 | 5 | 6 | 7 | 8 | 9 | 10 | 11 | 12 | 13 | 14 | 15 | 16 | 17 | 18 | 19 | 20 | 21 | 22 | 23 | 24 | 25 | 26 | 27 | 28 | 29 | 30 | 31 | 32 | 33 | 34 |
|---|---|---|---|---|---|---|---|---|---|---|---|---|---|---|---|---|---|---|---|---|---|---|---|---|---|---|---|---|---|---|---|---|---|---|
| Stadium | A | H | A | H | A | H | H | A | A | H | H | A | H | H | H | A | H | A | A | A | H | A | H | H | H | A | A | H | A | H | A | H | A | A |
| Result | W | D | W | D | L | W | W | L | L | L | W | W | W | D | W | L | W | W | W | W | L | W | L | D | W | W | W | D | W | L | D | L | W | W |
| Position | 3 | 4 | 2 | 2 | 4 | 3 | 2 | 3 | 6 | 7 | 4 | 4 | 2 | 3 | 2 | 2 | 2 | 2 | 1 | 1 | 1 | 1 | 1 | 1 | 1 | 1 | 1 | 1 | 1 | 1 | 1 | 1 | 1 | 1 |

Source: MLS
A = Away; H = Home; W = Win; D = Draw; L = Loss

==== Regular season ====
The MLS regular season schedule was released on December 19, 2024. Every team will play 34 matches, of which 17 are at home; this includes a full home-and-away series against the fourteen other teams in the Western Conference and six matches against opponents from the Eastern Conference. Unlike previous seasons, play will not be paused for the Leagues Cup in August.

| February 23 1 | LA Galaxy | 0–2 | San Diego FC | Carson, California |
| 4:00 pm PST | | Report | Godoy (yellow card) 45'; Dreyer 52', 90+3'; Negri (yellow card) 56' | Stadium: Dignity Health Sports Park; Attendance: 25,224; Referee: Allen Chapman |

| March 1 2 | San Diego FC | 0–0 | St. Louis City SC | San Diego, California |
| 7:30 pm PST | Negri (yellow card) 37'; Godoy (yellow card) 68'; McVey (yellow card) 90+1' | Report | Löwen (yellow card) 39'; Becher (yellow card) 44'; Wallem (yellow card) 73'; Durkin (yellow card) 76'; Hiebert (yellow card) 87' | Stadium: Snapdragon Stadium; Attendance: 34,506; Referee: Lukasz Szpala |

| March 8 3 | Real Salt Lake | 1–3 | San Diego FC | Sandy, Utah |
| 6:30 pm PST | Piol 17'; Ojeda (yellow card) 69'; Cabral (yellow card) 76'; Glad (yellow card) 79' | Report | Negri 43'; Tverskov (yellow card) 77'; Dreyer 90+1'; Ingvartsen 90+6' | Stadium: America First Field; Attendance: 19,337; Referee: Alexis Da Silva |

| March 15 4 | San Diego FC | 1–1 | Columbus Crew | San Diego, California |
| 7:30 pm PDT | Ángel (yellow card) 31'; Valakari 69' | Report | Arfsten 13'; Zawadzki (yellow card) 33'; Arfsten (red card) 61'; Chambost (yellow card) 90+1'; Rossi (yellow card) 90+5'; Schulte (yellow card) 90+9' | Stadium: Snapdragon Stadium; Attendance: 30,018; Referee: Victor Rivas |

| March 23 5 | Austin FC | 2–1 | San Diego FC | Austin, Texas |
| 1:00 pm PDT | Vazquez 10'; Gallagher 19'; Pereira (yellow card) 33' | Report | Pilcher (yellow card) 3'; de la Torre (yellow card) 14', (goal) 27'; McVey (yellow card) 55' | Stadium: Q2 Stadium; Attendance: 20,738; Referee: Filip Dujic |

| March 29 6 | San Diego FC | 3–2 | Los Angeles FC | San Diego, California |
| 7:30 pm PDT | Negri (yellow card) 14'; McVey 21'; Tverskov (yellow card) 24'; Valakari 34'; Mighten 40'; Kumado (yellow card) 88'; Lozano (yellow card) 90+6' | Report | Martínez (yellow card) 19'; Jesus (yellow card) 20' (yellow-red card) 53'; Smolyakov 43'; Ünder 45+5'; Segura (yellow card) 90+4' | Stadium: Snapdragon Stadium; Attendance: 32,502; Referee: Tori Penso |

| April 5 7 | San Diego FC | 3–0 | Seattle Sounders FC | San Diego, California |
| 7:30 pm PDT | Tverskov 2'; Godoy 41'; Lozano 45+3'; Negri (yellow card) 60'; de la Torre (yellow card) 64'; Mighten (yellow card) 80' | Report | Leyva (yellow card) 68' | Stadium: Snapdragon Stadium; Attendance: 28,228; Referee: Malik Badawi |

| April 12 8 | Colorado Rapids | 3–2 | San Diego FC | Commerce City, Colorado |
| 6:30 pm PDT | Mihailovic 37' (pen.); Yapi 53'; Navarro 60'; Awaziem (yellow card) 90' | Report | de la Torre 50'; Ángel 89' | Stadium: Dick's Sporting Goods Park; Attendance: 15,694; Referee: Sergii Boiko |

| April 19 9 | Charlotte FC | 3–0 | San Diego FC | Charlotte, North Carolina |
| 4:30 pm PDT | Abada 11'; Agyemang 45' (pen.); Privett 57'; Bronico (yellow card) 59'; Williamson (yellow card) 77' | Report | Reyes (yellow card) 32' (yellow-red card) 39'; Diop (yellow card) 67'; Lozano (yellow card) 90+2' | Stadium: Bank of America Stadium; Attendance: 29,653; Referee: Filip Dujic |

| April 26 10 | San Diego FC | 1–3 | Real Salt Lake | San Diego, California |
| 4:30 pm PDT | Lozano 45+6' (pen.), (yellow card) 73'; Bombino (yellow card) 56'; Alvarado Jr. (yellow card) 87' | Report | Katranis (yellow card) 45+1'; Luna 45+1', 54' (pen.); Junqua 66'; Quinton (yellow card) 83'; Gonçalves (yellow card) 86'; Hidalgo (yellow card) 90+3' (yellow-red card) 90+6' | Stadium: Snapdragon Stadium; Attendance: 28,116; Referee: Ricardo Fierro |

| May 3 11 | San Diego FC | 5–0 | FC Dallas | San Diego, California |
| 6:00 pm PDT | Lozano 20' (pen.), 27'; Tverskov (yellow card) 55'; Dreyer 56'; Valakari 73'; Iloski 87' | Report | Urhoghide (yellow card) 36'; Ramiro (yellow card) 76' | Stadium: Snapdragon Stadium; Attendance: 27,108; Referee: Joe Dickerson |

| May 10 12 | St. Louis City SC | 1–2 | San Diego FC | St. Louis, Missouri |
| 5:30 pm PDT | Ostrák (yellow card) 59'; Hiebert 90+1'; Baumgartl (yellow card) 90+6' | Report | Valakari (yellow card) 39'; Iloski 79'; Dreyer 87'; Verhoeven (yellow card) 90+6' | Stadium: Energizer Park; Attendance: 22,423; Referee: Allen Chapman |

| May 14 13 | San Diego FC | 2–0 | Colorado Rapids | San Diego, California |
| 7:30 pm PDT | Tverskov (yellow card) 6'; McVey 33'; Dreyer 58', (yellow card) 85'; Kumado (yellow card) 66' | Report | Yapi (yellow card) 25'; Cabral (yellow card) 65'; Ku-Dipietro (yellow card) 78'; Harris (yellow card) 83' | Stadium: Snapdragon Stadium; Attendance: 22,361; Referee: Lorenzo Hernandez |

| May 17 14 | San Diego FC | 0–0 | Sporting Kansas City | San Diego, California |
| 7:30 pm PDT | Godoy (yellow card) 21'; Bombino (yellow card) 37' | Report | Miller (yellow card) 9'; Bassong (yellow card) 46'; García (yellow card) 68' | Stadium: Snapdragon Stadium; Attendance: 25,233; Referee: Victor Rivas |

| May 24 15 | San Diego FC | 2–1 | LA Galaxy | San Diego, California |
| 1:30 pm PDT | Lozano (yellow card) 30', (goal) 90+5'; de la Torre 41' | Report | Cerrillo (yellow card) 37'; Fagúndez 40'; Pec (yellow card) 45+3'; Yamane (yellow card) 62'; Reus (yellow card) 84' | Stadium: Snapdragon Stadium; Attendance: 30,114; Referee: Jon Freemon |

| May 28 16 | Seattle Sounders FC | 1–0 | San Diego FC | Seattle, Washington |
| 5:30 pm PDT | Rothrock (yellow card) 27'; Ferreira 58'; Kossa-Rienzi (yellow card) 84' | Report | Verhoeven (yellow card) 81' | Stadium: Lumen Field; Attendance: 30,041; Referee: Ismir Pekmic |

| May 31 17 | San Diego FC | 2–0 | Austin FC | San Diego, California |
| 7:30 pm PDT | McVey (yellow card) 35'; Godoy (yellow card) 56'; de la Torre 60'; Iloski 90+2' | Report | Svatok (yellow card) 53' | Stadium: Snapdragon Stadium; Attendance: 27,133; Referee: Ricardo Montero |

| June 14 18 | Minnesota United FC | 2–4 | San Diego FC | Saint Paul, Minnesota |
| 5:30 pm PDT | McVey 8' (o.g.); Yeboah 38' | Report | Dreyer 11', 66' (pen.); Iloski 75', 90+2' | Stadium: Allianz Field; Attendance: 19,661; Referee: Rubiel Vazquez |

| June 25 19 | Vancouver Whitecaps FC | 3–5 | San Diego FC | Vancouver, British Columbia |
| 7:30 pm PDT | Ocampo 43'; Laborda (yellow card) 52', (goal) 66'; Cubas (yellow card) 81'; Coupland 90+6' | Report | McVey (yellow card) 23'; Iloski 35', 37', 44', 47'; Alvarado Jr. (yellow card) 45+5'; Ángel 90' | Stadium: BC Place; Attendance: 20,867; Referee: Ramy Touchan |

| June 28 20 | FC Dallas | 2–3 | San Diego FC | Frisco, Texas |
| 5:30 pm PDT | Musa 44'; Lletget 56'; Moore (yellow card) 60'; Farrington (yellow card) 70'; Ntsabeleng (yellow card) 90+2'; Acosta (yellow card) 90+10' | Report | Dreyer 26' (pen.); Lozano 77'; Ángel 90+6'; Valakari (yellow card) 90+10' | Stadium: Toyota Stadium; Attendance: 11,004; Referee: Guido Gonzales Jr. |

| July 5 21 | San Diego FC | 3–4 | Houston Dynamo FC | San Diego, California |
| 7:30 pm PDT | Iloski 25'; Bombino 54'; Valakari 67'; dos Santos (yellow card) 84' | Report | Ennali 36'; Escobar 45+3'; Lingr (yellow card) 53'; Raines (yellow card) 58'; Bartlow (yellow card) 62'; Ponce 87' (pen.), 90+10'; Bassi (yellow card) 90+1'; Holmes (yellow card) 90+2'; Dueñas (yellow card) 90+14' | Stadium: Snapdragon Stadium; Attendance: 28,321; Referee: Timothy Ford |

| July 12 22 | Chicago Fire FC | 1–2 | San Diego FC | Chicago, Illinois |
| 5:30 pm PDT | Pineda (yellow card) 30'; Cuypers 87'; Gutiérrez (yellow card) 90+6' | Report | Valakari (yellow card) 2'; Dreyer 8', 48'; Boateng (yellow card) 82' | Stadium: Soldier Field; Attendance: 27,631; Referee: Victor Rivas |

| July 16 23 | San Diego FC | 0–1 | Toronto FC | San Diego, California |
| 7:30 pm PDT | de la Torre (yellow card) 40'; Valakari (yellow card) 45'; Bombino (yellow card) 65'; Pilcher (yellow card) 90'; Boateng (yellow card) 90+2' | Report | Corbeanu 20' (pen.), (yellow card) 45+3'; Coello (yellow card) 90+4'; Long (yellow card) 90+5' | Stadium: Snapdragon Stadium; Attendance: 23,514; Referee: Alyssa Pennington |

| July 19 24 | San Diego FC | 1–1 | Vancouver Whitecaps FC | San Diego, California |
| 7:30 pm PDT | Bombino (yellow card) 12'; Pilcher 79' | Report | Duah 40' (o.g.); Ocampo (yellow card) 44'; Laborda (yellow card) 51'; Halbouni (yellow card) 90+6'; Johnson (yellow card) 90+8' | Stadium: Snapdragon Stadium; Attendance: 27,418; Referee: Alexis Da Silva |

| July 25 25 | San Diego FC | 1–0 | Nashville SC | San Diego, California |
| 7:30 pm PDT | Lozano 53'; Bombino (yellow card) 71'; Tverskov (yellow card) 88' | Report | Zimmerman (yellow card) 18'; Palacios (yellow card) 32'; Lovitz (yellow card) 69' | Stadium: Snapdragon Stadium; Attendance: 28,114; Referee: Drew Fischer |

| August 9 26 | Sporting Kansas City | 0–2 | San Diego FC | Kansas City, Kansas |
| 5:30 pm PDT | García (yellow card) 65' | Report | Lozano 23'; Dreyer 70' | Stadium: Children's Mercy Park; Attendance: 16,579; Referee: Pierre-Luc Lauziere |

| August 17 27 | San Jose Earthquakes | 1–2 | San Diego FC | San Jose, California |
| 4:00 pm PDT | Martínez 72'; Daniel (yellow card) 80'; Judd (yellow card) 89' | Report | Ingvartsen 80'; Duah (yellow card) 83'; Dreyer 84', (yellow card) 84'; Boateng (yellow card) 86' | Stadium: PayPal Park; Attendance: 17,546; Referee: Joe Dickerson |

| August 23 28 | San Diego FC | 0–0 | Portland Timbers | San Diego, California |
| 7:30 pm PDT | de la Torre (yellow card) 25'; Dreyer (yellow card) 33'; McVey (yellow card) 70' | Report | | Stadium: Snapdragon Stadium; Attendance: 27,810; Referee: Rosendo Mendoza |

| August 31 29 | Los Angeles FC | 1–2 | San Diego FC | Los Angeles, California |
| 7:45 pm PDT | Bouanga 15' | Report | Lozano 33'; Dreyer 66', (yellow card) 69' | Stadium: BMO Stadium; Attendance: 22,937; Referee: Filip Dujic |

| September 13 30 | San Diego FC | 1–3 | Minnesota United FC | San Diego, California |
| 7:30 pm PDT | Duah (yellow card) 54'; Tverskov 90+5' | Report | Lod (yellow card) 14'; Díaz (yellow card) 28'; Boxall (yellow card) 36'; Harvey (yellow card) 49', (goal) 77'; Markanich 74'; St. Clair (yellow card) 90'; Triantis 90+2' | Stadium: Snapdragon Stadium; Attendance: 27,158; Referee: Tori Penso |

| September 20 31 | Atlanta United FC | 1–1 | San Diego FC | Atlanta, Georgia |
| 1:30 pm PDT | Almirón 61', (yellow card) 90' | Report | Lozano (yellow card) 6'; Dreyer 32' | Stadium: Mercedes-Benz Stadium; Attendance: 43,499; Referee: Ricardo Montero |

| September 27 32 | San Diego FC | 0–1 | San Jose Earthquakes | San Diego, California |
| 7:30 pm PDT | | Report | Martínez 14'; Vieira (yellow card) 71'; Bouda (yellow card) 83' | Stadium: Snapdragon Stadium; Attendance: 29,437; Referee: Armando Villarreal |

| October 4 33 | Houston Dynamo FC | 2–4 | San Diego FC | Houston, Texas |
| 5:30 pm PDT | Andrade 15'; Ponce (yellow card) 39'; Santos 87'; Ennali (yellow card) 90+1' | Report | Dreyer 53' (pen.), 89'; Godoy (yellow card) 77'; Harangi (yellow card) 78'; Pilcher (yellow card) 83'; de la Torre 85'; Pellegrino 90+13' | Stadium: Shell Energy Stadium; Attendance: 20,732; Referee: Drew Fischer |

| October 18 34 | Portland Timbers | 0–4 | San Diego FC | Portland, Oregon |
| 6:00 pm PDT | Paredes (yellow card) 42'; J. Ortiz (yellow card) 51' | Report | Pellegrino 26', 63'; Dreyer 47', 49'; Godoy (yellow card) 65' | Stadium: Providence Park; Attendance: 24,920; Referee: Victor Rivas |

=== MLS Cup Playoffs ===
==== Round One ====
| October 26 Round One | San Diego FC | 2−1 | Portland Timbers | San Diego, California |
| 6:30 pm PDT | Valakari 23'; Dreyer 30'; Bombino (yellow card) 90+1'; Pilcher (yellow card) 90+7' | Report | Velde 36', (yellow card) 90+7'; Fory (yellow card) 65' (yellow-red card) 66' | Stadium: Snapdragon Stadium; Attendance: 32,500; Referee: Chris Penso |

| November 1 Round One | Portland Timbers | 2–2 (3–2 p) | San Diego FC | Portland, Oregon |
| 6:30 pm PDT | Velde 18', (yellow card) 52'; Kelsy (yellow card) 45'; Chará (yellow card) 62'; Župarić (yellow card) 90+5'; Guerra 90+8' | Report | McVey (yellow card) 43'; Pellegrino 45+12', (yellow card) 69'; Lozano 51', (yellow card) 82'; McNair (yellow card) 72' | Stadium: Providence Park; Attendance: 19,260; Referee: Drew Fischer |
| | Penalties |
| | Mora (penalty scored); Paredes (penalty missed); Fernandez (penalty missed); Velde (penalty scored); Antony (penalty scored) | | (penalty scored) Dreyer; (penalty scored) Lozano; (penalty missed) Valakari; (penalty missed) Ingvartsen; (penalty missed) Tverskov |

| November 9 Round One | San Diego FC | 4–0 | Portland Timbers | San Diego, California |
| 6:00 pm PST | Dreyer 5', 79'; Pellegrino 17', 53'; Duah (yellow card) 36'; Baird (yellow card) 55'; Bombino (yellow card) 75' | Report | Fory (yellow card) 29'; Paredes (yellow card) 66'; Ayala (yellow card) 71'; Mosquera (red card) 80'; K. Miller (yellow card) 86' | Stadium: Snapdragon Stadium; Attendance: 32,500; Referee: Joe Dickerson |

==== Conference Semifinals ====
| November 24 Conference Semifinals | San Diego FC | 1–0 | Minnesota United FC | San Diego, California |
| 7:00 pm PST | Dreyer 72'; Pilcher (yellow card) 77'; Sisniega (yellow card) 90+4'; Ingvartsen (yellow card) 90+5' | Report | Triantis (yellow card) 15'; Yeboah (yellow card) 20'; Markanich (yellow card) 81'; Harvey (yellow card) 90+2' | Stadium: Snapdragon Stadium; Attendance: 32,502; Referee: Rosendo Mendoza |

==== Conference Finals ====
| November 29 Conference Finals | San Diego FC | 1–3 | Vancouver Whitecaps FC | San Diego, California |
| 6:00 pm PST | Valakari (yellow card) 27'; Lozano 60' (yellow card) 75'; Duah (yellow card) 66'; Sisniega (red card) 79' | Report | Ocampo (yellow card) 5'; White 8', 45+2'; Sisniega 11' (o.g.); Cubas (yellow card) 60' | Stadium: Snapdragon Stadium; Attendance: 32,502; Referee: Joe Dickerson |

=== Leagues Cup ===
San Diego FC was awarded a berth in the 2025 Leagues Cup that had been forfeited by Vancouver Whitecaps FC due to their participation in the 2025 Canadian Championship and the 2025 CONCACAF Champions Cup.

| July 29 GS | Pachuca (Mexico) | 3–2 | (United States) San Diego FC | San Diego, California |
| 8:00 pm PDT | Guzmán 23'; Domínguez (yellow card) 44', (goal) 45+3', 67'; Pedraza (yellow card) 45+1'; Bautista (yellow card) 74'; Montiel (yellow card) 90+3' | Report | Bombino (yellow card) 66', (goal) 90+10'; Mighten (yellow card) 77'; Boateng 88'; Dreyer (red card) 90+2'; de la Torre (yellow card) 90+8' | Stadium: Snapdragon Stadium; Attendance: 21,872; Referee: Ekaterina Koroleva |

| August 1 GS | UANL (Mexico) | 2–1 | (United States) San Diego FC | San Diego, California |
| 8:00 pm PDT | Garza (yellow card) 27'; Correa 31', 67' | Report | Vazquez (yellow card) 39'; Ángel 55'; Harangi (yellow card) 81'; Bombino (yellow card) 90+4' | Stadium: Snapdragon Stadium; Attendance: 25,915; Referee: César Ramos |

| August 5 GS | Mazatlán (Mexico) | 0–2 | (United States) San Diego FC | San Diego, California |
| 7:00 pm PDT | Merolla (yellow card) 17'; Colula (yellow card) 55'; Benedetti (red card) 79' | Report | Godoy (yellow card) 12'; Valakari 66', 74'; Harangi (yellow card) 90+2' | Stadium: Snapdragon Stadium; Attendance: 5,709; Referee: Walter Lopez |

== Friendlies ==
On January 3, 2025, San Diego FC and Liga MX club Club América announced an agreement to play friendlies at Snapdragon Stadium in 2025 and 2027. The friendly against Club América was moved from June 21 to 7 due to a potential scheduling conflict with the FIFA Club World Cup if América were to qualify.

| June 7 Friendly | San Diego FC (United States) | 3–0 | (Mexico) América | San Diego, California |
| 7:00 pm PDT | | | | Stadium: Snapdragon Stadium |
Note: Originally scheduled for June 21.

| September 16 Friendly | San Diego FC (United States) | 4–2 | (Mexico) Tijuana | San Diego, California |
| 7:00 pm PDT | | | | Stadium: Snapdragon Stadium |

== Players ==
For the 2025 season, San Diego FC were permitted a maximum of 30 signed players on the first team, of which 10 roster positions were designated for supplemental and reserve players. Additional homegrown players are eligible to be signed to off-roster slots and are able to appear in MLS matches through short-term agreements. The senior players in the first 20 roster positions count towards a base salary cap of $5.95 million with exceptions for certain categories, including up to three Designated Players who counted for a set amount in the cap.

=== Roster ===
As of August 22, 2025

Note: Flags indicate national team as defined under FIFA eligibility rules. Players may hold more than one non-FIFA nationality. Squad includes all players who had first team contracts or appearances during the 2024 season across all competitions. Ages listed for each player is calculated from February 22, 2025, the first matchday of the MLS regular season.

San Diego FC first team roster
| No. | Name | Nationality | Position | Age | Previous club | Notes |
|---|---|---|---|---|---|---|
| 1 | CJ dos Santos | United States | GK | 24 | Inter Miami CF (USA) | |
| 2 | Willy Kumado | Ghana | DF | 22 | Lyngby BK (DEN) | International |
| 3 | Leo Duru | United States | DF | 20 | Blackburn Rovers F.C. (ENG) | |
| 4 | Andrés Reyes | Colombia | DF | 25 | New York Red Bulls (USA) | |
| 5 | Hamady Diop | Senegal | DF | 23 | Charlotte FC (USA) | International |
| 6 | Jeppe Tverskov | Denmark | MF | 31 | FC Nordsjælland (DEN) | International |
| 7 | Marcus Ingvartsen | Denmark | FW | 29 | FC Nordsjælland (DEN) | |
| 8 | Onni Valakari | Finland | MF | 25 | Pafos (CYP) | International |
| 9 | Tomás Ángel | Colombia | FW | 22 | Los Angeles FC (USA) | U-22, International |
| 10 | Anders Dreyer | Denmark | FW | 26 | R.S.C. Anderlecht (BEL) | DP, International |
| 11 | Hirving Lozano | Mexico | FW | 29 | PSV Eindhoven (NED) | DP |
| 13 | Pablo Sisniega | Mexico | GK | 29 | San Antonio FC (USA) | |
| 14 | Luca de la Torre | United States | MF | 26 | Celta Vigo (ESP) | |
| 15 | Pedro Soma | United States | MF | 18 | UE Cornellà (ESP) | |
| 17 | Paddy McNair | Northern Ireland | DF | 28 | West Bromwich Albion F.C. (ENG) | International |
| 18 | Duran Ferree | United States | GK | 18 | FC Nordsjælland (DEN) | |
| 19 | David Vazquez | United States | MF | 19 | Philadelphia Union (USA) | |
| 20 | Aníbal Godoy | Panama | MF | 35 | Nashville SC (USA) | |
| 21 | Corey Baird | United States | FW | 29 | FC Cincinnati (USA) | |
| 22 | Franco Negri | Argentina | DF | 30 | Inter Miami CF (USA) | |
| 23 | Aiden Harangi | United States | MF | 19 | Eintracht Frankfurt (GER) | |
| 24 | Emmanuel Boateng | Ghana | MF | 31 | New England Revolution (USA) | |
| 25 | Ian Pilcher | United States | DF | 21 | UNC Charlotte (USA) | |
| 26 | Manu Duah | Ghana | MF | 19 | UC Santa Barbara (USA) | International |
| 27 | Luca Bombino | United States | DF | 24 | Los Angeles FC (USA) | |
| 29 | Anisse Saidi | Tunisia | FW | 16 | Philadelphia Union (USA) | |
| 33 | Oscar Verhoeven | United States | DF | 18 | San Jose Earthquakes (USA) | |
| 70 | Alejandro Alvarado Jr. | United States | MF | 21 | F.C. Vizela (POR) | |
| 77 | Alex Mighten | England | MF | 22 | Nottingham Forest F.C. (ENG) | |
| 90 | Amahl Pellegrino | Norway | FW | 34 | San Jose Earthquakes (USA) | |
| 97 | Christopher McVey | Sweden | DF | 27 | D.C. United (USA) | |

== Coaching staff ==
As of December 2024

Technical staff
| Position | Name | Nationality |
|---|---|---|
| Head coach | Mikey Varas | United States |
| Assistant coach | Frank Hjortebjerg | Denmark |
| Assistant coach | Kelvin Jones | United States |
| Assistant coach | Luciano Fusco | United States |
| Goalkeeper coach | Jason Grubb | United States |

== Transfers ==
For transfers in, dates listed are when San Diego FC officially signed the player to the roster. Transactions where only the rights to the players are acquired are not listed. For transfers out, dates listed are when San Diego FC officially removed the players from its roster, not when they signed with another club. If a player later signed with another club, his new club will be noted, but the date listed here remains the one when he was officially removed from the San Diego FC roster.

=== In ===
Incoming transfers for San Diego FC
| Player | No. | Pos. | Previous team | Notes | Date |
|---|---|---|---|---|---|
| Duran Ferree (USA) | 18 | GK | San Diego Loyal SC (USA) | Loaned to FC Nordsjælland until end of 2024–25 Danish Superliga | December 13, 2023 |
| Jeppe Tverskov (DEN) | 6 | MF | FC Nordsjælland (DEN) | Loaned to FC Nordsjælland until January 2025 | March 19, 2024 |
| Marcus Ingvartsen (DEN) | 7 | FW | FC Nordsjælland (DEN) | Loaned to FC Nordsjælland until January 2025 | March 19, 2024 |
| Paddy McNair (NIR) | 17 | DF | Middlesbrough F.C. (ENG) | Loaned to West Bromwich Albion F.C. until January 2025 | July 25, 2024 |
| Hirving Lozano (MEX) | 11 | FW | PSV Eindhoven (NED) | Designated Player; loaned to PSV Eindhoven until January 1, 2025 | June 6, 2024 |
| Alex Mighten (ENG) | 77 | MF | Nottingham Forest F.C. (ENG) | Loaned to FC Nordsjælland until January 2025; discovery rights acquired from Nashville SC for $50,000 in general allocation money | August 30, 2024 |
| Tomás Ángel (COL) | 9 | FW | Los Angeles FC (USA) | Traded for $200,000 in general allocation money and a second-round pick in the 2025 MLS SuperDraft | December 9, 2024 |
| CJ dos Santos (USA) | 1 | GK | Inter Miami CF (USA) | Traded for $100,000 in general allocation money | December 11, 2024 |
| Christopher McVey (SWE) | 97 | DF | D.C. United (USA) | Traded for $50,000 in general allocation money with an additional $50,000 based on performance | December 11, 2024 |
| Heine Gikling Bruseth (NOR) | 16 | DF | Orlando City SC (USA) | Acquired in MLS Expansion Draft | December 11, 2024 |
| Hamady Diop (SEN) | 5 | DF | Charlotte FC (USA) | Acquired in MLS Expansion Draft | December 11, 2024 |
| Jasper Löffelsend (GER) | 19 | MF | Colorado Rapids (USA) | Acquired in MLS Expansion Draft | December 11, 2024 |
| Andrés Reyes (COL) | 4 | DF | New York Red Bulls (USA) | Traded for $800,000 in general allocation money | December 12, 2024 |
| Jacob Jackson (USA) | 98 | GK | San Jose Earthquakes (USA) | Selected in 2024 MLS Re-Entry Draft Stage 1 | December 13, 2024 |
| Aníbal Godoy (PAN) | 20 | MF | Nashville SC (USA) | Free agent | December 19, 2024 |
| Manu Duah (GHA) | 26 | MF | UC Santa Barbara (USA) | MLS SuperDraft | December 20, 2024 |
| Pablo Sisniega (MEX) | 13 | GK | San Antonio FC (USA) | Free | December 27, 2024 |
| Anisse Saidi (TUN) | 29 | FW | Philadelphia Union Academy (USA) | Homegrown player | January 3, 2025 |
| Emmanuel Boateng (GHA) | 24 | MF | New England Revolution (USA) | Trade | January 6, 2025 |
| Franco Negri (ARG) | 22 | DF | Inter Miami CF (USA) | Re-Entry Draft Stage 2 | January 7, 2025 |
| Onni Valakari (FIN) | 8 | MF | Pafos FC (CYP) | Loan | January 13, 2025 |
| Alejandro Alvarado Jr. (USA) | 70 | MF | F.C. Vizela (POR) | Transfer | January 14, 2025 |
| Luca de la Torre (USA) | 14 | MF | Celta Vigo (ESP) | Loan | January 21, 2025 |
| Anders Dreyer (DEN) | 10 | FW | R.S.C. Anderlecht (BEL) | Designated Player; Transfer | January 22, 2025 |
| Yaw Yeboah (GHA) | — | MF | Columbus Crew (USA) | Re-Entry Draft Stage 2 | January 24, 2025 |
| Ian Pilcher (USA) | 25 | DF | UNC Charlotte (USA) | 2025 MLS SuperDraft | January 27, 2025 |
| Willy Kumado (GHA) | 2 | DF | Lyngby BK (DEN) | Transfer | February 10, 2025 |
| Luca Bombino (USA) | 27 | DF | Los Angeles FC (USA) | Loan | February 25, 2025 |
| Milan Iloski (USA) | 32 | FW | FC Nordsjælland (DEN) | Loan | April 2, 2025 |
| Oscar Verhoeven (USA) | 33 | DF | San Jose Earthquakes (USA) | Loan | April 21, 2025 |
| Aiden Harangi (USA) | 23 | DF | Eintracht Frankfurt (GER) | Loan | July 16, 2025 |
| Pedro Soma (USA) | 15 | MF | UE Cornellà (ESP) | Transfer | July 28, 2025 |
| David Vazquez (USA) | 19 | MF | Philadelphia Union (USA) | Loan | July 28, 2025 |
| Corey Baird (USA) | 21 | FW | FC Cincinnati (USA) | Trade | August 6, 2025 |
| Leo Duru (USA) | 3 | DF | Blackburn Rovers F.C. (ENG) | Loan | August 20, 2025 |
| Amahl Pellegrino (NOR) | 90 | FW | San Jose Earthquakes (USA) | Trade | August 22, 2025 |

=== Expansion draft picks ===
In the 2024 MLS expansion draft, San Diego FC made five selections from a list of eligible players signed with other MLS teams. The club traded away two of their players on the same day as the draft.

2024 MLS Expansion Draft picks
| Player | Nationality | Pos. | Previous team | Notes |
|---|---|---|---|---|
| Heine Gikling Bruseth | Norway | MF | Orlando City SC (USA) | |
| Jasper Löffelsend | Germany | MF | Colorado Rapids (USA) | |
| Hamady Diop | Senegal | DF | Charlotte FC (USA) | |
| Thiago Andrade | Brazil | MF | New York City FC (USA) | Traded to Toronto FC for first-round 2025 MLS SuperDraft pick and $250,000 in conditional general allocation money |
| Hosei Kijima | Japan | MF | St. Louis City SC (USA) | Traded to D.C. United for $400,000 in general allocation money |

=== Out ===
Outgoing transfers for San Diego FC
| Player | No. | Pos. | New team | Notes | Date |
|---|---|---|---|---|---|
| Duran Ferree (USA) | — | GK | FC Nordsjælland (DEN) | Loaned until June 30, 2025 | September 28, 2024 |
| Yaw Yeboah (GHA) | — | MF | Los Angeles FC (USA) | Trade | January 24, 2025 |
| Heine Gikling Bruseth (NOR) | 16 | MF | Sarpsborg 08 (NOR) | Loan | July 10, 2025 |
| Milan Iloski (USA) | 32 | FW | FC Nordsjælland (DEN) | Loan Return | July 16, 2025 |
| Jasper Löffelsend (GER) | 19 | DF | ŁKS Łódź (POL) | Free | July 16, 2025 |
| Jacob Jackson (USA) | 98 | GK | FC Dallas (USA) | Trade | July 31, 2025 |

=== Other transactions ===
- On December 12, 2024, San Diego FC acquired two international roster slots from Seattle Sounders FC for $250,000 in general allocation money

== Player awards ==
=== MLS Player of the Matchday ===
| Week | Player | Position | Opponent |
|---|---|---|---|
| 1 | Anders Dreyer | FW | LA Galaxy |
| 11 | Hirving Lozano | FW | FC Dallas |
| 20 | Milan Iloski | FW | Vancouver Whitecaps |

=== MLS Player of the Month ===
| Month | Player | Stats | Ref. |
|---|---|---|---|
| June | (Denmark) Anders Dreyer | 3 matches played, 3 goals, 6 assists | |

=== MLS Team of the Matchday ===
| Week | Player(s) | Opponent(s) |
|---|---|---|
| 1 | XI: Anders Dreyer; Coach: Mikey Varas | LA Galaxy |
| 2 | Bench: Jeppe Tverskov | St. Louis City SC |
| 3 | XI: Anders Dreyer (2) | Real Salt Lake |
| 4 | XI: Onni Valakari | Columbus Crew |
| 6 | XI: Christopher McVey; Bench: Onni Valakari; Coach: Mikey Varas (2) | Los Angeles FC |
| 7 | XI: Hirving Lozano; Bench: Jeppe Tverskov | Seattle Sounders FC |
| 11 | XI: Hirving Lozano (2); Anders Dreyer (3) | FC Dallas |
| 12 | Bench: Anders Dreyer | St. Louis City SC |
| 13 | XI: Anders Dreyer (4); Bench: CJ dos Santos; Christopher McVey | Colorado Rapids |
| 15 | XI: Hirving Lozano (3) | LA Galaxy |
| 17 | Bench: Luca de la Torre | Austin FC |
| 19 | XI: Anders Dreyer (5); Milan Iloski; Bench: Jeppe Tverskov | Minnesota United FC |
| 20 | XI: Anders Dreyer (6); Milan Iloski (2); Coach: Mikey Varas (3) | Vancouver Whitecaps |
| 21 | XI: Anders Dreyer (7) | FC Dallas |
| 22 | Bench: Onni Valakari | Houston Dynamo FC |
| 24 | XI: Luca Bombino; Anders Dreyer (8); Bench: Hirving Lozano | Chicago Fire FC |
| 26 | Bench: Ian Pilcher | Vancouver Whitecaps |
| 27 | XI: Manu Duah; Bench: Pablo Sisniega | Nashville SC |
| 28 | XI: Anders Dreyer (9); Bench: CJ dos Santos | Sporting Kansas City |
| 29 | XI: Marcus Ingvartsen; Coach: Mikey Varas | San Jose Earthquakes |
