= MLS International Roster Slots =

Piece of roster composition in Major League Soccer

MLS International Roster Slots are an important piece of roster composition in Major League Soccer. MLS employs a variety of mechanisms to promote parity and domestic player development which include player entry drafts, expansion drafts, allocation drafts, weighted lotteries, and a limit on the number of international roster slots available for each team. The limit on the number of international roster slots makes each slot a valuable commodity for teams to utilize through player signings or trades with other teams.

The MLS roster rules for 2025 state:

- A total of 241 international roster slots are divided among the 30 teams. In 2008, each MLS team was given the right to have eight international players on its roster and each subsequent expansion teams were given the right to have eight international roster slots for its inaugural season. These roster slots are tradable, in full season increments, such that some teams may have more than eight and some teams may have fewer than eight. There is no limit on the number of international roster slots on each team's roster.
- For teams based in the United States, a domestic player is either:
  - a U.S. citizen;
  - a permanent resident (green card holder); or
  - the holder of other special status (e.g., has been granted refugee or asylum status); or
  - a player who qualifies under the Homegrown International Rule.
- For teams based in Canada, a domestic player is either:
  - a Canadian citizen; or
  - the holder of certain other special status (e.g., has been granted refugee or asylum status); or
  - a player who qualifies under the Homegrown International Rule; or
  - a U.S. Domestic Player.
- MLS teams based in Canada are required to have a minimum of three Canadian Domestic Players on their rosters. In addition to the International Roster Slots, each Canadian club is permitted to designate up to three International Players who have been under contract with MLS and registered with one or more Canadian clubs for at least one year who will not count toward the club’s International Roster Slots.
- Homegrown International Rule: regardless of nationality, any player who meets the requirements to qualify as a Homegrown Player as a member of an MLS team academy, either in the U.S. or Canada, or has met similar requirements as a member of a Canadian Approved Youth Club, will count as a domestic player on both U.S. and Canadian team rosters provided that:
  - the player became a member of an MLS team academy, either in the U.S. or Canada, or a Canadian Approved Youth Club in the year prior to the year in which he turns 16; and
  - the player signs his first professional contract with MLS or an MLS team's MLS Next Pro affiliate.

== Current international roster slots by team ==
As of May 1, 2025

Team	Total slots	International Players	DL	L	SEIL	Open slots	International players under contract
Atlanta United FC	8	7	0	0	0	1	Abram, Almirón, Amador, Klich, Latte Lath, Lobzhanidze, Miranchuk
Austin FC	9	7	0	0	0	2	Biro, Bukari, Dubersarsky, Obrian, Sabovic, Svatok, Uzuni
Charlotte FC	8	8	0	0	0	0	Abada, Biel, Diani, Doumbia, Petković, Tavares, Toklomati, Zaha
Chicago Fire	8	9	0	1	0	0	Bamba, Barroso, Cuypers, D’Avilla, Glasgow, Haile-Selassie, Kouamé, Koutsias (on loan with Lugano), Zinckernagel
FC Cincinnati	7	5	0	0	0	2	Bucha, Denkey, Engel, Flores, Orellano
Colorado Rapids	4	5	1	0	0	0	Amadou, Awaziem, Fadal^{DL}, Maxsø, Ronan
Columbus Crew	8	7	0	0	0	1	Camacho, Chambost, Cheberko, Farsi, Herrera, Lappalainen, Moreira
D.C. United	8	7	0	0	0	1	Benteke, Enow, Kim, Peglow, Peltola, Rowles, Schnegg
FC Dallas	9	11	0	2	1	1	Augusto, Cafumana, Jesus^{SEIL}, Delgado, Kaick, Musa, Pedrinho, Ramiro, Sainté (on loan with Phoenix Rising), Sali (on loan with Al-Riyadh), Urhoghide
Houston Dynamo	8	9	1	0	0	0	Ennali, Kowalczyk, Lingr, Olusanya, Ortiz, Ponce, Quiñónes^{DL}, Urso, Gyamfi
Inter Miami CF	14	14	0	0	0	0	Alba, Allende, Bright, Busquets, Falcón, Luján, Martínez, Messi, Obando, Rodríguez, Segovia, Suárez, Ustari, Weigandt
LA Galaxy	11	13	1	1	0	0	Aude, Garcés, Jørgensen, Mićović, Nascimento, Paintsil, Pec, Puig^{DL}, Reus, Sanabria, Vivi (on loan with Deportivo Saprissa), Yamane, Yoshida
Los Angeles FC	11	10	1	0	0	2	Bouanga, Dellavalle^{DL}, Holm, Jesus, Lloris, Martínez, Palencia, Smolyakov, Ünder, Yeboah
Minnesota United FC	8	9	0	2	0	1	Bran (on loan with Alajuelense), Díaz, Duggan, Gene, Jeong, Kmeť (on loan with Górnik Zabrze), Pereyra, Romero, Yeboah
CF Montreal	5	9	0	2	0	1	Adedokun (on loan with Lexington SC), Bugaj, Cóccaro (on loan with Atlas), Ibrahim^{+}, Loturi, Opoku^{+}, Owusu^{+}, Pearce, Synchuk
Nashville SC	5	6	0	1	0	0	Pacius (on loan with Tampa Bay Rowdies), Palacios, Qasem, Surridge, Tagseth, Yazbek
New England Revolution	8	9	0	1	0	0	Ceballos, Chancalay, Feingold, Fofana, Ganago, Ivačič, Langoni, Oyirwoth^{L}, Yusuf
New York City FC	8	5	0	1	0	4	Martínez, Mijatović (on loan with OH Leuven), O'Neill, Tanasijević, Wolf
New York Red Bulls	11	13	1	1	0	0	Bogacz, Carballo, Choupo-Moting, Donkor, Eile, Forsberg, Gjengaar, Hack, Mina (on loan with Estrela da Amadora), Morales, Morgan^{DL}, Sofo, Valencia
Orlando City SC	7	8	0	0	2	1	Atuesta, Caraballo, Cartagena^{SEIL}, Gerbet, Muriel, Pašalić, Rodríguez, Tsukada^{SEIL}
Philadelphia Union	7	7	0	0	0	0	Baribo, Damiani, Glavinovich, Jacques, Lukić, Makhanya, Semmle
Portland Timbers	6	6	0	0	0	1	Da Costa, Fory, Kelsy, Ortiz, Pantemis, Surman
Real Salt Lake	11	14	1	2	1	1	Agada, Ajago (on loan with Lexington SC), Barea, Bell^{DL}, Brook, Brown^{SEIL}, Cabral, Gonçalves, Katranis, Lambert (on loan with Louisville City FC), Marczuk, Ojeda, Palacio, Piol
San Diego FC	9	9	0	1	0	1	Ángel, Bruseth (On loan with Sarpsborg 08), Diop, Dreyer, Duah, Kumado, McNair, Tverskov, Valakari
San Jose Earthquakes	6	6	0	1	0	1	Costa, Daniel, López (on loan with Argentinos Juniors), Pellegrino, Rodrigues, Wilson
Seattle Sounders FC	4	4	0	0	0	0	de la Vega, Kim, Kent, Minoungou
Sporting Kansas City	7	5	0	0	0	2	Bassong, Fernández, García, Joveljic, Suleymanov
St. Louis City	8	8	0	1	0	1	Alm, Baumgartl, Bürki, Hartel, Jeong, Klauss, Pidro (on loan with Velež Mostar), Wallem
Toronto FC	10	11	0	1	0	2	Brynhildsen, Coello^{+}, Dominguez, Flores, Gomis, Insigne, Long, Mailula (on loan with Wydad AC), Monlouis, Petretta^{+}, Rosted
Vancouver Whitecaps FC	8	8	0	0	0	3	Bovalina, Cubas^{+}, Gauld^{+}, Laborda, Ocampo, Ngando, Takaoka, Veselinović^{+}
Total	241	249	6	18	4	29	

Key

- DL – Player is on the disabled list (DL) and does not occupy international slot while on the DL
- L – Player is away on loan and does not occupy international slot while out on loan
- SEIL – Player is on the season-ending injury list (SEIL) and does not occupy international slot while on the SEIL
- + – In addition to the International Roster Slots, each Canadian Club is permitted to designate up to three International Players who have been under contract with MLS and registered with one or more Canadian clubs for at least one year who will not count toward the club’s International Roster Slots.

== Active international roster slot trades ==
Trade date	Slot acquired by	For use through	Acquired from	Slot acquired in exchange for
June 29, 2005	Colorado Rapids	Permanent	Real Salt Lake	For Adolfo Gregorio
March 17, 2009	New York Red Bulls	Permanent	Houston Dynamo	For allocation money
November 24, 2010	Vancouver Whitecaps FC	December 31, 2031	Colorado Rapids	For Sanna Nyassi

== Future international roster slot trades ==
Trade date	Slot acquired by	For use starting	For use through	Acquired from	Slot acquired in exchange for
