= 2024 MLS expansion draft =

Player draft for MLS teams

2024 MLS Expansion Draft

General information
- Sport: Soccer
- Date: December 11, 2024

Overview
- 5 total selections in 5 rounds
- League: Major League Soccer
- Expansion teams: San Diego FC
- Expansion season: 2025

The 2024 MLS Expansion Draft was a special draft for the Major League Soccer expansion team San Diego FC that was held on December 11, 2024. The list of eligible players was revealed on December 10, 2024, which included 354 players from the 29 other MLS teams. San Diego FC selected five players in the draft.

The draft was conducted live at the Mission Valley shopping mall adjacent to San Diego FC's apparel store. It was streamed online and televised on KSWB.

== Format ==
All 29 teams from the 2024 season were subject to the draft. San Diego had five selections in the expansion draft. Once a player was chosen from any of the 29 teams, that team could not have another player chosen. That team also received $50,000 in general allocation money, unless the club is eligible for compensation allocation per the CBA due to bona fide offers to free agents. Each team had 12 protection slots that they may apply to any draft eligible player on their senior, and supplemental rosters. Generation Adidas players in slots 21–24 of a teams roster, and homegrown under the age of 25 as of the end of the 2024 season were not eligible for the draft. Players with contracts expiring at the end of the season, were part of a team's roster and were eligible for the draft. If the team had an option on the player's contract and protects the player, the team was not obligated to exercise that option after the draft. In the case of players with no-trade clauses, a team must have used one of their protection slots for that player. Teams must have protected one less player in international slots than there were recently on their roster (i.e. 4 players on international slots, 3 players must have been protected). The list of eligible players was released on December 10, 2024. The draft was shown on San Diego FC's website and a local channel in San Diego.

== Expansion draft picks ==
Pick	MLS team	Player	Previous team	Notes
1	San Diego FC	Heine Gikling Bruseth	Orlando City	
2	San Diego FC	Hamady Diop	Charlotte FC	
3	San Diego FC	Jasper Löffelsend	Colorado Rapids	
4	San Diego FC	Hosei Kijima	St. Louis City	Traded to D.C. United in exchange for $400,000 in general allocation money
5	San Diego FC	Thiago Andrade	New York City	Traded to Toronto FC in exchange for $250,000 in general allocation money and a 2025 1st round pick (9th overall)

== Team-by-team-breakdown ==
=== Atlanta United FC ===
Exposed
Luis Abram
Erik Centeno
Nicolas Firmino
Ronald Hernández
Franco Ibarra
Daniel Ríos
Xande Silva

=== Austin FC ===
Exposed
Matt Bersano
Stefan Cleveland
Jimmy Farkarlun
Ethan Finlay
Matt Hedges
Hector Jiménez
Žan Kolmanič
Alexander Ring
Diego Rubio
Leo Väisänen
Jhojan Valencia

=== Charlotte FC ===
Exposed
Ben Bender
David Bingham
Hamady Diop
Jahlane Forbes
George Marks
Pep Biel
Chituru Odunze
Jamie Paterson
João Pedro
Nick Scardina
Tyger Smalls
Karol Swiderski
Iuri Tavares
Idan Toklomati
Bill Tuiloma
Jere Uronen
Júnior Urso

=== Chicago Fire FC ===
Exposed
Allan Arigoni
Rafael Czichos
Bryan Dowd
Jeffrey Gal
Chase Gasper
Gastón Giménez
Fabian Herbers
Ariel Lassiter
Wyatt Omsberg
Spencer Richey
Arnaud Souquet
Laurence Wootton

=== FC Cincinnati ===
Exposed
London Aghedo
Joey Akpunonu
Yamil Asad
Corey Baird
Isaiah Foster
Nicholas Gioacchini
Nick Hagglund
Bret Halsey
Alec Kann
Kipp Keller
Evan Louro
Malik Pinto
Alvas Powell
Sérgio Santos

=== Colorado Rapids ===
Exposed
Lalas Abubakar
Ethan Bandré
Remi Cabral
Daniel Chacón
Omir Fernandez
Nate Jones
Jonathan Lewis
Jasper Löffelsend
Andreas Maxsø

=== Columbus Crew ===
Exposed
Evan Bush
Dylan Chambost
Nicholas Hagen
Andrés Herrera
DeJuan Jones
Derrick Jones
Alexandru Mățan
Abraham Romero
Yaw Yeboah

=== FC Dallas ===
Exposed
Eugene Ansah
Paul Arriola
Herbert Endeley
Liam Fraser
Omar Gonzalez
Asier Illarramendi
Geovane Jesus
Sam Junqua
Amet Korça
Sebastian Lletget
Jimmy Maurer
Isaiah Parker
Tomas Pondeca
Ruan
Carl Sainté
Ema Twumasi

=== D.C. United ===
Exposed
Alex Bono
Russell Canouse
Nathan Crockford
Cristian Dájome
Mateusz Klich
Pedro Santos
Christopher McVey
Tyler Miller
Martín Rodríguez
Hayden Sargis
Luis Zamudio

=== Houston Dynamo FC ===
Exposed
Exon Arzú
Ethan Bartlow
Latif Blessing
Steve Clark
Sebastian Ferreira
McKinze Gaines
Ján Greguš
Héctor Herrera
Sebastian Kowalczyk
Júnior Moreno
Tate Schmitt
Gabriel Segal
Brad Smith
Daniel Steres
Ousmane Sylla
Jefferson Valverde

=== Inter Miami CF ===
Exposed
Leo Afonso
CJ Dos Santos
Nicolás Freire
Julian Gressel
Cole Jensen
Sergii Kryvtsov
Franco Negri
Emerson Rodríguez
Matías Rojas
Ryan Sailor
Lawson Sunderland
Oscar Ustari
Marcelo Weigandt

=== Sporting Kansas City ===
Exposed
Robert Castellanos
Danny Flores
Andreu Fontàs
Tim Melia
Alan Pulido
Nemanja Radoja
Chris Rindov
Johnny Russell
Dániel Sallói
Khiry Shelton
Rémi Walter

=== Los Angeles Galaxy ===
Exposed
Aaron Bibout
Miguel Berry
Gastón Brugman
Martín Cáceres
Diego Fagúndez
Tucker Lepley
Isaiah Parente
Brady Scott
Gino Vivi
Maya Yoshida
Eriq Zavaleta

=== Los Angeles FC ===
Exposed
Eduard Atuesta
Maxime Chanot
Lorenzo Dallavalle
Thomas Hasal
Kei Kamara
Luis Mueller
Tommy Musto
Lewis O'Brien
David Ochoa
Diego Rosales
Ilie Sánchez
Marlon Santos
Eddie Segura
Carlos Vela

=== Minnesota United FC ===
Exposed
Jordan Adebayo-Smith
Hugo Bacharach
Alejandro Bran
Ethan Bristow
Derek Dodson
Morris Duggan
Franco Fragapane
Clint Irwin
Matúš Kmeť
Anthony Markanich
Loïc Mesanvi
Moses Nyeman
Teemu Pukki
Samuel Shashoua
Alec Smir
D. J. Taylor
Wil Trapp
Zarek Valentin

=== CF Montréal ===
Exposed
Matías Cóccaro
Gabriele Corbo
Grayson Doody
Raheem Edwards
Ilias Iliadis
Logan Ketterer
Lassi Lappalainen
Josef Martínez
Matteo Schiavoni
Joaquín Sosa
Robert Thorkelsson
Victor Wanyama

=== Nashville SC ===
Exposed
Forster Ajago
Brian Anunga
Teal Bunbury
Sean Davis
Aníbal Godoy
Brent Kallman
Randall Leal
Jack Maher
Woobens Pacius
Elliot Panicco
Amar Sejdić
Joey Skinner
Taylor Washington
Dru Yearwood

=== New England Revolution ===
Exposed
Xavier Arreaga
Joshua Bolma
Nacho Gil
Tommy McNamara
Jonathan Mensah
Tim Parker
Ryan Spaulding
Bobby Wood

=== New York City FC ===
Exposed
Thiago Andrade
Monsef Bakrar
Rio Hope-Gund
Thiago Martins
Jovan Mijatović
Maxi Moralez
Birk Risa
Tomás Romero
Strahinja Tanasijević

=== New York Red Bulls ===
Exposed
Cory Burke
Kyle Duncan
Dennis Gjengaar
Elias Manoel
Ryan Meara
Juan Mina
Aidan O'Connor
Mohammed Sofo
Dante Vanzeir

=== Orlando City SC ===
Exposed
David Brekalo
Heine Gikling Bruseth
Gastón González
Jeorgio Kocevski
Nicolás Lodeiro
Jack Lynn
Felipe Martins
Carlos Mercado
Luis Muriel
Abdi Salim
Kyle Smith
Mason Stajduhar
Yutaro Tsukada

=== Philadelphia Union ===
Exposed
Samuel Adeniran
Alejandro Bedoya
Jamir Berdecio
Chris Donovan
Jack Elliott
Leon Flach
Isaiah LeFlore
Joquín Torres

=== Portland Timbers ===
Exposed
Miguel Araujo
Diego Chará
Marvin Loría
Zachery McGraw
Eric Miller
Trey Muse
Cristhian Paredes
Mason Toye
Eryk Williamson
Dario Župarić

=== Real Salt Lake ===
Exposed
Matthew Bell
Kevin Bonilla
Andrew Brody
Lachlan Brook
Javain Brown
Noel Caliskan
Maikel Chang
Matt Crooks
Tomás Gómez
Erik Holt
Bertin Jacquesson
Kevon Lambert
Zac MacMath
Rubio Rubín
Benji Michel
Ilijah Paul
Marcelo Silva

=== San Jose Earthquakes ===
Exposed
Carlos Akapo
Tanner Beason
Vítor Costa
Jeremy Ebobisse
Carlos Gruezo
Jacob Jackson
Preston Judd
JT Marcinkowski
Paul Marie
Alfredo Morales
Amahl Pellegrino
Jamar Ricketts
Tommy Thompson
William Yarbrough
Jackson Yueill

=== Seattle Sounders FC ===
Exposed
Jonathan Bell
Braudílio Rodrigues
João Paulo
Danny Musovski
Nathan
Raúl Ruidíaz
Albert Rusnák

=== St. Louis City SC ===
Exposed
Njabulo Blom
Jake Girdwood-Reich
Kyle Hiebert
Hosei Kijima
John Klein
Ben Lundt
Jake Nerwinski
Joakim Nilsson
Christian Olivares
Tomáš Ostrák
Selmir Pidro
Célio Pompeu
Jayden Reid
Nökkvi Thórisson
Akil Watts
Michael Wentzel
Josh Yaro

=== Toronto FC ===
Exposed
Nathaniel Edwards
Deybi Flores
Lorenzo Insigne
Aimé Mabika
Cassius Mailula
Shane O'Neill
Prince Owusu
Jordan Perruzza
Raoul Petretta
Greg Ranjitsingh
Sigurd Rosted
Charlie Sharp

=== Vancouver Whitecaps FC ===
Exposed
Joe Bendik
Giuseppe Bovalina
Nicolas Fleuriau Chateau
Belal Halbouni
Levonte Johnson
Damir Kreilach
Luís Martins
J.C. Ngando
Fafà Picault
Ryan Raposo
Alessandro Schöpf
Yohei Takaoka
Bjørn Utvik
