= Corey Baird =

American soccer player (born 1996)

Personal information
- Full name: Corey Jacob Baird
- Date of birth: January 30, 1996 (age 30)
- Place of birth: Escondido, California, United States
- Height: 5 ft 10 in (1.78 m)
- Position: Winger

Youth career
- 2002–2004: FC Heat
- 2005–2012: San Diego Surf
- 2012–2014: Real Salt Lake AZ

College career
Years	Team	Apps	(Gls)
2014–2017	Stanford Cardinal	83	(16)

Senior career*
Years	Team	Apps	(Gls)
2015	PSA Elite		
2016–2017	Burlingame Dragons	14	(1)
2018–2020	Real Salt Lake	83	(15)
2018	→ Real Monarchs (loan)	1	(1)
2021	Los Angeles FC	14	(3)
2021–2023	Houston Dynamo	64	(10)
2024–2025	FC Cincinnati	40	(3)
2025	San Diego FC	5	(0)

International career^{‡}
2011–2013	United States U17		
2013–2014	United States U18		
2014	United States U20		
2015	United States U23		
2019	United States	4	(0)
- * Club domestic league appearances and goals as of October 22, 2025 ‡ National team caps and goals as of September 10, 2019

Corey Jacob Baird (born January 30, 1996) is a retired American professional soccer player who played as a winger.

== Club career ==
=== Early career ===
Baird, from Escondido, California, 20 miles from San Diego, began his youth career with FC Heat, where he played from 2002 to 2004, before moving to San Diego Surf, where he played from 2005 through 2012. Corey played his final year of youth soccer with Real Salt Lake AZ, Real Salt Lake's U.S. Soccer Development Academy (DA) team. Corey played in the DA from 2010 through 2014.

From 2008 through 2014, Baird participated in Cal-South Olympic Development Program or ODP and various age group US soccer youth national teams. In August 2011, Baird was invited and attended the United States men's national under-17 soccer team Residency Program, hosted at the IMG Academy in Bradenton, Florida, from 2011 to 2013.

=== Collegiate ===
On February 6, 2013, Baird signed a National Letter of Intent to play for Stanford University. In his freshman year with the Cardinal, Baird appeared in all 19 matches, making 14 starts in the midfield and helped lead Stanford to its first Pac-12 men's soccer championship since 2001. Baird was twice named Pac-12 Player of the Week during the conference season and was named second team All-Pac-12 that year. He was also named to first team Freshman All-American teams by Soccer America and College Soccer News.

In his sophomore year, Baird started all 23 matches, helping to lead Stanford to both defend its Pac-12 men's soccer championship and win its first NCAA Division I Men's Soccer Championship. Baird was named to the NCAA College Cup All-Tournament team and again named to second team All-Pac-12

In his junior year, Baird appeared in all 23 matches, making 22 starts in the midfield and at forward, helping to lead Stanford to win its third consecutive Pac-12 men's soccer championship and defend its NCAA Division I Men's Soccer Championship. Baird was named to both the NCAA College Cup All-Tournament team and All-Pac-12 first team, as well as earning Pac-12 Player of the Week during the conference season.

In his senior year, Baird appeared in 18 matches, making 16 starts at forward, helping to lead Stanford to win its fourth consecutive Pac-12 men's soccer championship and its third consecutive NCAA Division I Men's Soccer Championship. Baird was named to the United Soccer Coaches All-Far West Region first team, All-Pac 12 first team, and earned Pac-12 Player of the Week during the conference season.

Baird completed his Stanford career tied for third all-time in career assists while also scoring 16 goals.

=== Real Salt Lake ===
On January 5, 2018, Baird signed as a Homegrown Player for Real Salt Lake of Major League Soccer. Baird made his RSL debut on March 17 as a 66th-minute substitute during a 1–0 win over the New York Red Bulls. He was then sent to the Real Monarchs, RSL's USL affiliate, where Baird scored in a 3–2 win over the Tulsa Roughnecks in the Monarchs' first match of the season. Baird returned to the RSL first team following the match. He scored his first goal for Real Salt Lake on March 30 in a 3–1 loss to Toronto FC. He made his first MLS start on April 7 and picked up his first career assist in the match, helping Real Salt Lake defeat Vancouver Whitecaps FC 2–1. On May 12, scored in a 3–2 win against D.C. United with a diving header. The goal was later named MLS Goal of the Week. Baird ended the MLS regular season with 31 appearances, eight goals, and five assists, helping RSL finish sixth in the Western Conference and qualify for the playoffs. His good performances saw him named MLS Rookie of the Year. In the playoffs, Baird started and helped RSL beat LAFC 3–2 in the knockout round. He made 1 substitute over the 2 legs of the conference semi-finals, as Real Salt Lake lost 5–3 to Sporting Kansas City on aggregate.

Baird and RSL opened the 2019 season on March 2 against the Houston Dynamo, with Baird picking up an assist in a 1–1 draw. He scored his first goal of the season on May 14, helping Real Salt Lake to a 3–2 win over Rocky Mountain Cup rivals Colorado Rapids. On August 10, Baird scored twice to give RSL a 2–1 win against Sporting Kansas City. The performance against SKC saw him named to the MLS Team of the Week. He scored again in their next match, a 3–0 win over Seattle Sounders FC on August 14. Baird finished the regular season with 5 goals and 4 assists from 31 appearances, as Real Salt Lake finished 3rd in the West. Baird picked up an assist to help RSL beat the Portland Timbers 2–1 in the first round of the playoffs. He would start the next match as RSL fell 2–0 to Seattle in the conference semi-finals. Baird also made one appearance in the U.S. Open Cup and one appearance in the Leagues Cup during the season.

On January 24, 2020, Baird signed a contract extension with Real Salt Lake. After the first two games of the 2020 season, with Baird appearing in both, the MLS season was paused due to the COVID-19 pandemic. MLS returned to play in July with the MLS is Back Tournament, with the group stage counting towards the regular season, while the knockout rounds did not. Baird started all 3 group stage games and picked up an assist, helping RSL advance. On July 27, he recorded an assist in their 5–2 loss to the San Jose Earthquakes in the round of 16. On August 22, in Real Salt Lake's first match following MLS is Back, Baird scored once and had an assist in a 4–1 win vs the Rapids. In a shortened season due to COVID-19, Baird appeared in 21 of a possible 23 games, scoring twice and recording 4 assists. It was a poor season for Real Salt Lake as a team, finishing 11th in the Western Conference and failing to make the playoffs.

=== Los Angeles FC ===
On January 11, 2021, Baird was traded to Los Angeles FC in exchange for $500,000 General Allocation Money, a 2021 international roster spot, and future considerations. He made his debut for LAFC on April 14 against Austin FC, scoring the opener in a 2–0 victory. On May 1, he scored to give LAFC a 1–1 draw with the Houston Dynamo. Baird scored three goals and had two assists in 14 appearances for LAFC.

=== Houston Dynamo ===
On July 30, 2021, after just seven months with Los Angeles FC, Baird was traded to the Houston Dynamo for $750,000 in allocation money and an international slot. He made his Dynamo debut on July 31, coming off the bench in a 0–0 draw against Real Salt Lake. After appearing in three games for Houston, Baird missed the next seven due to a leg injury. Baird made seven appearances his first season in Houston; the Dynamo finished last in the Western Conference, missing out on the playoffs.

On May 25, Baird scored his first goal of the season, and of his Dynamo career, in a 2–1 loss to Sporting Kansas City in an Open Cup match. He scored his first MLS goal for Houston on August 27 in a 2–1 loss to Minnesota United FC. Baird ended the season with 23 appearances, 2 goals, and 4 assists in MLS play, plus 2 appearances and a goal in the Open Cup. Houston failed to qualify for the playoffs again, finishing with 13th in the West. 2023 proved a career-best season for Baird, who scored in every competition for Houston, including a run to the round of 16 in Leagues Cup, an Open Cup title, a fourth-place finish in the Western Conference, and an appearance in the Conference Finals.

=== FC Cincinnati ===
On January 11, 2024, FC Cincinnati signed forward Corey Baird to a contract through 2025 with an option for 2026.

=== San Diego FC ===
On August 6, 2025, FC Cincinnati traded Baird to MLS Expansion side San Diego FC for $100,000 in allocation money.

== International career ==
=== Youth ===
Baird was a member of the U.S. under-17 squad that competed in the 2013 CONCACAF U-17 Championship in Panama City, starting all four matches. He also represented the U.S. in the United States men's national under-14, under-15, under-18, under-20 and under-23 soccer teams.

=== Senior ===
On December 20, 2018, Baird was invited to participate in head coach Gregg Berhalter's first United States senior men's national soccer team camp from January 6, 2019, to February 2, 2019, in Chula Vista, CA. He made his debut on January 27, 2019, in a friendly against Panama, as a starter.

== Career statistics ==
=== College ===
As of match played December 10, 2017

School	Season	NCAA Regular Season				NCAA Tournament			Total		
School	Season	Division	Apps	Goals	Assists	Apps	Goals	Assists	Apps	Goals	Assists
Stanford University	2014	Div. I	18	4	4	1	0	0	19	4	4
Stanford University	2015	Div. I	18	2	8	5	1	5	23	3	13
Stanford University	2016	Div. I	18	3	6	5	0	0	23	3	6
Stanford University	2017	Div. I	13	6	5	5	0	2	18	6	7
NCAA Total			67	15	23	16	1	7	83	16	30

=== Club ===
As of match played July 26, 2025

Appearances and goals by club, season and competition
Club	Season	League			Playoffs		National cup (Note: Includes U.S. Open Cup)		League cup (Note: Includes Leagues Cup)		Continental		Total	
Club	Season	Division	Apps	Goals	Apps	Goals	Apps	Goals	Apps	Goals	Apps	Goals	Apps	Goals
Burlingame Dragons	2016	PDL	8	1	2	1	—		—		—		10	2
Burlingame Dragons	2017	PDL	6	0	—		—		—		—		6	0
Burlingame Dragons	Total		14	1	2	1	—		—		—		16	2
Real Salt Lake	2018	MLS	31	8	2	0	—		—		—		33	8
Real Salt Lake	2019	MLS	31	5	2	0	1	0	1	0	—		35	5
Real Salt Lake	2020	MLS	21	2	1 (Note: Appearance in the MLS is Back Tournament Ro16)	0	—		—		—		22	2
Real Salt Lake	Total		83	15	5	0	1	0	1	0	—		90	15
Real Monarchs (loan)	2018	USLC	1	1	—		—		—		—		1	1
Los Angeles FC	2021	MLS	14	3	—		—		—		—		14	3
Houston Dynamo	2021	MLS	7	0	—		—		—		—		7	0
Houston Dynamo	2022	MLS	23	2	—		2	1	—		—		25	3
Houston Dynamo	2023	MLS	34	8	5	1	5	3	4	2	—		48	14
Houston Dynamo	Total		64	10	5	1	7	4	4	2	—		80	17
FC Cincinnati	2024	MLS	22	3	1	0	—		4	0	3 (Note: Appearances in CONCACAF Champions Cup)	0	30	3
FC Cincinnati	2025	MLS	18	0	—		—		—		4	0	22	0
FC Cincinnati	Total		40	3	1	0	—		4	0	7	0	52	3
San Diego	2025	MLS	0	0	—		—		—		—		0	0
Career total			216	33	13	2	8	4	9	2	7	0	253	41

=== International ===
As of match played September 10, 2019

National Team	Year	Apps	Goals
United States	2019	4	0
Total		4	0

== Honors ==
Houston Dynamo

- U.S. Open Cup: 2023

Individual

- NSCAA High School All-American: 2013
- First team All-Pac-12: 2016, 2017
- MLS Rookie of the Year: 2018

Stanford

- Pac-12 Conference Championship: 2014, 2015, 2016, 2017
- NCAA Division I Men's Soccer Championship: 2015, 2016, 2017
