= Heine Gikling Bruseth =

Norwegian footballer (born 2004)

Personal information
- Date of birth: 6 April 2004 (age 22)
- Place of birth: Gjemnes Municipality, Norway
- Height: 1.77 m (5 ft 10 in)
- Position: Central midfielder

Team information
- Current team: Kristiansund
- Number: 10

Youth career
- 2018–2022: Kristiansund

Senior career*
Years	Team	Apps	(Gls)
2022–2024	Kristiansund	33	(2)
2022	→ Levanger (loan)	7	(0)
2024	Orlando City	0	(0)
2025–2026	San Diego FC	0	(0)
2025	→ Sarpsborg 08 (loan)	8	(0)
2026–	Kristiansund	23	(0)

International career^{‡}
2023	Norway U19	3	(0)
2023	Norway U20	3	(0)
2024	Norway U21	1	(0)
- * Club domestic league appearances and goals as of 12:20, 12 November 2026 (UTC) ‡ National team caps and goals as of 6 June 2024

Heine Gikling Bruseth (born 6 April 2004) is a Norwegian professional footballer who plays as a central midfielder for Eliteserien club Kristiansund.

== Club career ==
=== Kristiansund ===
Bruseth, a product of the Kristiansund academy, signed to the senior team in 2022. Bruseth was loaned to Norwegian Second Division club Levanger FK for a portion of the 2022 season. On 11 June, Bruseth made his senior debut when he came on as an 86th-minute substitute for Audun Engen Vik in a 4–1 win at Frigg Oslo FK. After seven appearances for the club, Bruseth returned to Kristiansund.

On 4 September, Bruseth made his debut for the club and only appearance of the season when he came on as a 91st-minute substitute for Sander Kartum in a 3–1 victory over Sandefjord. At the conclusion of the season, Kristiansund were relegated to the Norwegian First Division.

In the following season in the Norwegian First Division, Bruseth made 17 appearances in the league and helped Kristiansund to defeat Kongsvinger in the promotion play-offs on 3 December 2023. On 4 January 2024, Bruseth scored his first senior goal, the winning goal of a 3–2 victory on the opening game week at Lillestrøm SK. In total, Bruseth scored two goals across 15 appearances for the club in the 2024 season.

=== Orlando City ===
On 20 August 2024, Bruseth signed for Orlando City as a U22 Initiative player, signing through 2026 with club options to extend into 2027 and 2028. Bruseth did not make an appearance for Orlando City across the remainder of the season.

=== San Diego FC ===
On 11 December 2024, Bruseth was selected in 2024 MLS expansion draft by San Diego FC for their inaugural 2025 season. On 10 July 2025, Bruseth joined Eliteserien club Sarpsborg 08 on loan with an option to buy through the end of the 2025 season. Upon joining Sarpsborg 08 he was reunited with manager Christian Michelsen who previously managed Kristiansund. Three days later, Bruseth made his debut for the club when he came on as a 69th-minute substitute for Harald Nilsen Tangen in a scoreless draw with his former club, Kristiansund.

=== Return to Kristiansund ===
On 7 January 2026, after his return to San Diego FC, the team transferred Bruseth to his boyhood club, Kristiansund, for an undisclosed fee after failing to make a single competitive appearance for San Diego FC.

== Personal life ==
Bruseth was born on 6 April 2004 in Gjemnes Municipality in Nordmøre, Norway. He has two brothers, of whom Ådne has played in the same Norwegian clubs as Heine; Kristiansund and Levanger.

== International career ==
=== Youth ===
Bruseth was called up for Norway's U19 side for the 2023 UEFA European Under-19 Championship and he made his international debut on 4 July 2023 when he came on as a substitute for Alwande Roaldsøy in the 62nd-minute in a 5–4 victory over Greece in the first group stage match. Bruseth made his final appearance for the team on 13 July when came on as a 50th-minute substitute for Oliver Braude before being taken off in the 86th-minute for Dylan Ryan Murugesapillai in a 5–0 loss to Portugal in the semi-finals of the tournament.

Bruseth was called up to Norway's U20 side for the 2023–24 Under 20 Elite League. Bruseth made his debut for the team when he started in a 2–1 victory over Czechia on 12 October 2023 before being taken off in the 71st-minute for Oliver Braude.

Bruseth made his debut for Norway's U21 side on 6 June 2024 in a 3–3 friendly draw against Denmark in which he came on as a 62nd-minute substitute for Kristian Arnstad.

== Career statistics ==
=== Club ===
As of match played 9 November 2026

Club	Season	League			National cup (Note: Includes Norwegian Football Cup)		Continental		Other (Note: Includes Norwegian First Division playoff, MLS Cup playoffs, and Leagues Cup)		Total	
Club	Season	Division	Apps	Goals	Apps	Goals	Apps	Goals	Apps	Goals	Apps	Goals
Kristiansund	2021	Eliteserien	0	0	1	0	—		—		1	0
Kristiansund	2022	Eliteserien	1	0	1	0	—		—		2	0
Kristiansund	2023	Norwegian First Division	17	0	0	0	—		2	0	19	0
Kristiansund	2024	Eliteserien	15	2	0	0	—		—		15	2
Kristiansund	Total		33	2	2	0	0	0	2	0	37	2
Levanger (loan)	2022	Norwegian Second Division	7	0	0	0	—		—		7	0
Orlando City	2024	Major League Soccer	0	0	—		—		0	0	0	0
San Diego FC	2025	Major League Soccer	0	0	—		—		0	0	0	0
Sarpsborg 08 (loan)	2025	Eliteserien	8	0	0	0	—		—		8	0
Kristiansund	2026	Eliteserien	23	0	2	2	—		—		25	2
Career total			71	2	4	2	0	0	2	0	77	4
