= Manu Duah =

Ghanaian footballer (born 2005)

- Duah with San Diego FC in 2026

Personal information
- Full name: Kojo Manu Duah
- Date of birth: 5 June 2005 (age 21)
- Place of birth: Kumasi, Ghana
- Height: 1.93 m (6 ft 4 in)
- Position: Centre-back

Team information
- Current team: San Diego FC
- Number: 26

Youth career
- –2024: Santa Barbara SC

College career
Years	Team	Apps	(Gls)
2024	UC Santa Barbara Gauchos	14	(0)

Senior career*
Years	Team	Apps	(Gls)
2025–	San Diego FC	47	(0)
- * Club domestic league appearances and goals as of 02:39, 8 November 2026 (UTC)

Kojo Manu Duah (born 5 June 2005) is a Ghanaian professional footballer who plays as a centre-back for Major League Soccer club San Diego FC. A Generation Adidas player, he was selected with the number one overall pick in the 2025 MLS SuperDraft. Duah began his professional career as a defensive midfielder, but was moved into the centre-back position.

== College career ==
Duah played for one season as a freshman for UC Santa Barbara, appearing in 14 games for the Gauchos.

Starting in all 14 of his appearances, Duah helped the Gauchos to a 12–5–5 record in the 2024 season. Duah's collegiate career ended at the 2024 NCAA Division I men's soccer tournament where the Gauchos beat UCLA 1–0 in the first round in overtime before falling to Stanford in round 2 in penalties.

== Club career ==
Duah was selected with the No. 1 overall pick in the 2025 MLS SuperDraft by San Diego FC (SDFC). With the selection, Duah became the first-ever draft pick for San Diego FC, an expansion club. SDFC coach Mikey Varas has said that he believes Duah has potential to "dominate" the league.

On 25 June 2025, Duah made his Major League Soccer (MLS) debut in San Diego FC's 5–3 away win over Vancouver Whitecaps FC. On 19 July 2025, he made his first home start in a 1–1 draw against Vancouver Whitecaps FC. Despite scoring an own goal, he was selected as the player of the match.

On 3 February 2026, in round one of the 2026 CONCACAF Champions Cup against Pumas UNAM, Duah scored San Diego FC's first goal in a 4–1 comeback victory, his first professional goal. Later that year, on 3 September, he extended his contract with the club until 2030 with an option for another season.

== International career ==
In early May 2026, Duah was called up to the Ghana national team by head coach Carlos Queiroz for a friendly match against Mexico on 22 May, but did not make an appearance.

== Style of play ==
Duah began his professional playing career as a defensive midfielder, but after joining San Diego FC, transitioned to the centre-back position. Duah's first professional game was played as a midfielder, but ever since he has primarily played in the centre-back position.

== Personal life ==
Duah was born in and grew up in Kumasi, and he has two older brothers and a younger sister. Duah credits his father for inspiring him to develop his skills as a footballer before he died. After the death of his father, Duah had to drop out of school due to financial shortcomings, but he was given an opportunity at the New Life Academy in Accra to pursue both his education and his footballing career. Through the academy, Duah was able to enroll at Dunn School in Los Olivos, California, United States, when he was 16-years-old. However, the process of receiving his visa was delayed, and he was forced to start his education there online while in Ghana in order to not fall behind.

Dunn School's dean of students became Duah's legal guardian in the United States, and she acted as his host until he was able to get his own host family. While enrolled at Dunn School, Duah began playing for the Santa Barbara SC, and through his time playing with the club, he was connected to a family who would pick up their son and his teammates in order to bring them to practice and games. Duah formed a close connection with the family, and eventually asked if they would become his host family, and they agreed.

== Career statistics ==
As of match played 7 November 2026

Appearances and goals by club, season and competition
Club	Season	League			U.S. Open Cup		Continental		Playoffs		Other		Total	
Club	Season	Division	Apps	Goals	Apps	Goals	Apps	Goals	Apps	Goals	Apps	Goals	Apps	Goals
San Diego FC	2025	Major League Soccer	14	0	—		—		5	0	3 (Note: Appearances in Leagues Cup)	0	22	0
San Diego FC	2026	Major League Soccer	33	0	—		3 (Note: Appearances in CONCACAF Champions Cup)	1	—		2	0	38	1
Career total			47	0	0	0	3	1	5	0	5	0	60	1
