= Aiden Harangi =

American soccer player (born 2006)

Personal information
- Full name: Aiden Joshua Harangi
- Date of birth: February 8, 2006 (age 20)
- Place of birth: Reston, Virginia, United States
- Height: 1.75 m (5 ft 9 in)
- Position: Defender

Team information
- Current team: Zalaegerszeg
- Number: 2

Youth career
- –2015: Reston United
- 2015–2018: ASC Neuenheim
- 2018–2024: Eintracht Frankfurt

Senior career*
Years	Team	Apps	(Gls)
2024–2026	Eintracht Frankfurt II	22	(0)
2025	→ San Diego FC (loan)	5	(0)
2026–	Zalaegerszeg	1	(0)

International career^{‡}
2022	Hungary U16	3	(0)
2022	Hungary U17	2	(0)
2022–2023	United States U17	14	(1)
2023	United States U18	3	(0)
2024–2025	United States U19	5	(0)
2024–	United States U20	9	(0)
- * Club domestic league appearances and goals as of May 30, 2026 ‡ National team caps and goals as of June 10, 2025

Aiden Joshua Harangi (born February 8, 2006) is a professional soccer player who plays as a defender for Nemzeti Bajnokság I club Zalaegerszeg. Born in the United States, he has represented Hungary and the United States at youth level.

== Early life ==
Harangi was born on February 8, 2006. Born in Reston, Virginia, United States, he is the son of Hungarian footballer Péter Harangi.

== Club career ==
As a youth player, Harangi joined the youth academy of American side Reston United. Following his stint there, he joined the youth academy of German side ASC Neuenheim in 2015. Three years later, he joined the youth academy of German Bundesliga side Eintracht Frankfurt, where he played in the UEFA Youth League, and was promoted to the club's reserve team ahead of the 2024–25 season.

Subsequently, he was sent on loan to American side San Diego FC in 2025. On July 30, 2025, he debuted for the club during a 2–3 away loss to Pachuca in the Leagues Cup.

== International career ==
Harangi is a Hungary and United States youth international. During November 2023, he played for the United States men's national under-17 soccer team at the 2023 FIFA U-17 World Cup.
