= Ian Pilcher =

American soccer player (born 2003)

Personal information
- Full name: Ian Patrick Pilcher
- Date of birth: March 21, 2003 (age 23)
- Place of birth: Charlotte, North Carolina, United States
- Height: 6 ft 1 in (1.85 m)
- Position: Defender

Team information
- Current team: San Diego FC
- Number: 25

Youth career
- 2016–2021: Charlotte Soccer Academy

College career
Years	Team	Apps	(Gls)
2021–2024	Charlotte 49ers	66	(5)

Senior career*
Years	Team	Apps	(Gls)
2024	Grove United		
2025–	San Diego FC	17	(1)
- * Club domestic league appearances and goals as of October 22, 2025

Ian Patrick Pilcher (born March 21, 2003) is an American professional soccer player who plays as a defender for Major League Soccer club San Diego FC.

== Early life ==
Pilcher was born in Charlotte, North Carolina, where he attended Ardrey Kell High School and played club soccer for Charlotte Soccer Academy, where he was the club's captain for the last two seasons. He also earned a nomination for the Charlotte Soccer Gala Defender of the Year Award.

== College career ==
In 2021, Pilcher attended the University of North Carolina at Charlotte to play college soccer. Over four seasons with the 49ers, Pilcher made 66 appearances, scored five goals and tallied one assist. Over his college career, he was a two-time All-East Region and All-AAC selection. In 2024, he earned first-team honors, was named a CSC Academic All-American, and was recognized as the AAC's Preseason Defensive Player of the Year. In 2021, Pilcher earned a spot on the All-Conference USA Freshman Team.

== Club career ==
In 2024, Pilcher played with National Premier Soccer League side Grove United.

On December 20, 2024, Pilcher was selected 24th overall in the 2025 MLS SuperDraft by San Diego FC. On January 27, 2025, Pilcher was announced as a new signing for San Diego ahead of their inaugural season. He made his professional debut on February 23, 2025, appearing as an 88th-minute substitute during a 2–0 away win over LA Galaxy.
