= Willy Kumado =

Ghanaian footballer (born 2002)

Personal information
- Full name: William Kumado
- Date of birth: 16 October 2002 (age 24)
- Place of birth: Dansoman, Ghana
- Height: 5 ft 8 in (1.73 m)
- Position: Right-back

Team information
- Current team: San Diego FC
- Number: 2

Youth career
- Right to Dream
- 2021–2023: Nordsjælland

Senior career*
Years	Team	Apps	(Gls)
2021–2023	Nordsjælland	2	(0)
2023–2025	Lyngby	53	(0)
2025–	San Diego FC	19	(0)
- * Club domestic league appearances and goals as of 16:02, 22 October 2025 (UTC)

William "Willy" Kumado (born 16 October 2002) is a Ghanaian professional footballer who plays as a right-back for Major League Soccer club San Diego FC.

== Club career ==
=== Nordsjælland ===
Kumado was born in Dansoman, Ghana, and was part of the Right to Dream Academy before joining FC Nordsjælland in February 2021 alongside teammate Lasso Coulibaly. During his time at Right to Dream, he played in multiple positions, initially as a midfielder before being moved to centre-back and eventually settling as a right-back. Speaking about his journey, Kumado said, "Since I was a little boy, I have had the dream of playing football. Where I come from, you have to become part of an academy to achieve something in football." He made 13 appearances and scored one goal for the club's under-19 team during the remainder of the season.

On 17 October 2021, Kumado made his professional debut for Nordsjælland in the Danish Superliga against Midtjylland, coming on as a substitute for Oliver Villadsen in the 69th minute. He was initially included in the squad for the previous round against Silkeborg but was eventually left out for the final squad. Before being subbed in against Midtjylland, he recalled feeling a mix of excitement and nerves, saying, "When Flemming [Pedersen] called me over and told me I was coming on, I got goosebumps. I thought, 'Is this really happening?'" Kumado also appeared in the following league match against Vejle Boldklub on 22 October.

On 13 October 2022, Kumado was promoted permanently to Nordsjælland's senior squad after playing a key role as captain for the club's U19 team.

=== Lyngby ===
On 31 January 2023, Kumado left Nordsjælland and signed a two-and-a-half-year contract with league rivals Lyngby Boldklub. He made his debut for Lyngby on 19 February 2023, coming on as a substitute for Rezan Corlu in a 1–1 draw against his former club. A month later, on 19 March, he registered his first assist in a league match against AC Horsens, setting up Alfreð Finnbogason for the opening goal. Although Horsens equalised to secure another 1–1 draw, Kumado's performance earned him the Man of the Match award, as voted by Lyngby fans.

=== San Diego FC ===
On 10 February 2025, Major League Soccer club San Diego FC announced the signing of Kumado on a two-year contract with an additional two-year club option.

== Career statistics ==
As of match played 19 October 2025

Appearances and goals by club, season and competition
Club	Season	League			Cup		Continental		Other		Total	
Club	Season	Division	Apps	Goals	Apps	Goals	Apps	Goals	Apps	Goals	Apps	Goals
Nordsjælland	2021–22	Superliga	2	0	1	0	—		—		3	0
Nordsjælland	2022–23	Superliga	0	0	1	0	—		—		1	0
Nordsjælland	Total		2	0	2	0	—		—		4	0
Lyngby	2022–23	Superliga	9	0	0	0	—		—		9	0
Lyngby	2023–24	Superliga	27	0	4	0	—		—		31	0
Lyngby	2024–25	Superliga	17	0	0	0	—		—		17	0
Lyngby	Total		53	0	4	0	—		—		57	0
San Diego FC	2025	Major League Soccer	19	0	0	0	0	0	—		19	0
Career total			74	0	6	0	0	0	0	0	80	0
