= CJ dos Santos =

Footballer (born 2000)

- dos Santos in 2026

Personal information
- Full name: Carlos Joaquim Antunes dos Santos
- Date of birth: 24 August 2000 (age 26)
- Place of birth: Philadelphia, Pennsylvania, U.S.
- Height: 1.93 m (6 ft 4 in)
- Position: Goalkeeper

Team information
- Current team: San Diego FC
- Number: 1

Youth career
- 2004–2006: Fox Chase SC
- 2006–2011: Philadelphia SC
- 2011–2013: FC Delco
- 2013–2016: Philadelphia Union
- 2016–2019: Benfica

Senior career*
Years	Team	Apps	(Gls)
2019–2022	Benfica B	2	(0)
2022–2024	Inter Miami II	28	(0)
2022–2024	Inter Miami	2	(0)
2024–	San Diego FC	30	(0)

International career^{‡}
2016–2017	United States U17	7	(0)
2019	United States U20	2	(0)
2026–	Cape Verde	1	(0)
- * Club domestic league appearances and goals as of 22 October 2025 ‡ National team caps and goals as of 31 May 2026

Carlos Joaquim Antunes dos Santos (Portuguese: [ˈkaɾ.luʒ ʒu.ɐ.ˈkĩ ɐ̃.ˈtu.nɨʒ duʃ ˈsɐ̃.tuʃ]; born 24 August 2000), known as CJ dos Santos, is a professional footballer who plays as a goalkeeper for Major League Soccer club San Diego FC. Born in the United States, he plays for the Cape Verde national team.

== Club career ==
Dos Santos began playing football at the age of two, and continued his development with local football academies Fox Chase SC, Philadelphia SC, and FC Delco before moving to Philadelphia Union in 2013. In August 2016, he signed with the academy of Benfica in Portugal. Dos Santos made his professional debut with Benfica B in a 1–1 Liga Portugal 2 draw with F.C. Porto B on 25 January 2021.

On 11 February 2022, dos Santos signed with Major League Soccer club Inter Miami.

On 11 December 2024, dos Santos signed with Major League Soccer club San Diego FC.

== International career ==
Dos Santos was born in Philadelphia to a Cape Verdean father and a Portuguese mother from Coimbra. He was a youth international for the United States, having represented the United States U17s at the 2017 CONCACAF U-17 Championship and 2017 FIFA U-17 World Cup. He was called up for a training camp for the senior United States men's national soccer team in December 2020.

He was one of the players who were selected with the Cape Verde national team for the friendly matches against Chile and Finland on 27 and 30 March 2026, respectively.

On 13 May 2026, dos Santos' request to switch allegiance to Cape Verde was approved by FIFA. On 18 May, he was called up by Cape Verde's head coach Bubista for the 2026 FIFA World Cup.

== Career statistics ==
As of match played 1 November 2025

Appearances and goals by club, season and competition
Club	Season	League			National cup		Continental		Other		Total	
Club	Season	Division	Apps	Goals	Apps	Goals	Apps	Goals	Apps	Goals	Apps	Goals
Benfica B	2020–21	Liga Portugal 2	2	0	—		—		—		2	0
Benfica B	2021–22	Liga Portugal 2	0	0	—		—		—		0	0
Benfica B	Total		2	0	—		—		—		2	0
Inter Miami II	2022	MLS Next Pro	15	0	—		—		0	0	15	0
Inter Miami II	2023	MLS Next Pro	9	0	—		—		—		9	0
Inter Miami II	2024	MLS Next Pro	4	0	—		—		0	0	4	0
Inter Miami II	Total		28	0	—		—		0	0	28	0
Inter Miami	2022	Major League Soccer	0	0	0	0	—		0	0	0	0
Inter Miami	2023	Major League Soccer	1	0	0	0	—		0	0	1	0
Inter Miami	2024	Major League Soccer	1	0	—		0	0	1 (Note: Appearance in Leagues Cup)	0	2	0
Inter Miami	Total		2	0	0	0	0	0	1	0	3	0
San Diego FC	2025	Major League Soccer	30	0	—		—		3 (Note: Two appearances in MLS Cup playoffs, one appearance in Leagues Cup)	0	33	0
Career Total			65	0	0	0	0	0	4	0	69	0

== Honours ==
Inter Miami

- Supporters' Shield: 2024
- Leagues Cup: 2023
