= 2025 MLS SuperDraft =

College draft for soccer teams

General information
- Sport: Soccer
- Date: December 20, 2024
- Time: 3:00 p.m. EST
- Network: MLS Season Pass

Overview
- 90 total selections in 3 rounds
- League: Major League Soccer
- Teams: 30
- First selection: Manu Duah

The 2025 MLS SuperDraft was the 26th edition of the MLS SuperDraft, a sports draft to select amateur, usually collegiate, soccer players that are not affiliated with an MLS club, or college soccer players that had their homegrown player rights relinquished by their parent MLS club. The draft was held on December 20, 2024, marking the third year in a row that the draft was held in December. Despite the draft being held in 2024, the draft retained the 2025 branding.

== Format ==
Historically, the MLS SuperDraft has closely resembled that of the NFL draft:

1. Any expansion teams receive the first picks. This season, San Diego FC entered MLS.
2. Non-playoff clubs receive the next picks in reverse order of prior season finish.
3. Teams that made the MLS Cup playoffs are then ordered by which round of the playoffs they are eliminated.
4. The winners of the MLS Cup are given the last selection, and the losers the penultimate selection.

== Player selection ==
Player key
*	Denotes player who has been selected for an MLS Best XI team						
^	Member of 2025 Generation Adidas class						
†	Player who was named to an MLS Best XI and Generation Adidas						
Signed key
22	Denotes player who signed for a MLS team (Division I)						
1	Denotes player who signed for a USL Championship team (Division II)						
30	Denotes player who signed for a MLS Next Pro, USL League One or NISA team (Division III)						
	Denotes player who signed for a team outside the United States soccer league system						
27	Denotes player who returned to college team						
Positions key
GK	Goalkeeper	DF	Defender	MF	Midfielder	FW	Forward

=== First round ===
P	MLS team	Player	Year	Pos.	College	Conference	Academy team(s)	Other team(s)	Signed
1	San Diego FC	(Ghana) Manu Duah	Freshman	MF	UC Santa Barbara	Big West	Santa Barbara SC	—N/a	(United States) San Diego FC
2	San Jose Earthquakes	(United States) Max Floriani	Senior	DF	Saint Louis	A-10	—N/a	RKC Third Coast	(United States) San Jose Earthquakes
3	Chicago Fire FC	(United States) Dean Boltz	Freshman	FW	Wisconsin	Big Ten	Sockers FC	—N/a	(United States) Chicago Fire FC
4	Colorado Rapids (Note: Sporting Kansas City → Colorado Rapids. Colorado Rapids acquired the natural first round pick in the 2025 MLS SuperDraft from Sporting Kansas City in exchange for their own first round pick acquired from Philadelphia Union and $162,500 in 2025 GAM.)	(United States) Alex Harris	Sophomore	FW	Cornell	Ivy	Washington Timbers	United PDX	(United States) Colorado Rapids
5	San Jose Earthquakes (Note: New England Revolution → San Jose Earthquakes. San Jose Earthquakes acquired the natural first round pick in the 2025 MLS SuperDraft from New England Revolution in exchange for $200,000 in 2025 GAM.)	(United States) Reid Roberts	Junior	DF	San Francisco	WCC	Real Colorado	Tampa Bay United SC	(United States) San Jose Earthquakes
6	Colorado Rapids (Note: Nashville SC → Colorado Rapids. Colorado Rapids acquired the natural first round pick in the 2025 MLS SuperDraft from Nashville SC in exchange for $125,000 in 2025 GAM and $25,000 in 2026 conditional GAM.)	(United States) Matthew Senanou	Junior	DF	Xavier	Big East	Sockers FC	Chicago City SC; River Light FC	(United States) Colorado Rapids 2
7	St. Louis City SC	(Finland) Emil Jääskeläinen	Senior	FW	Akron	Big East	Blackpool	Kendal Town; Texas United; FC Motown	(United States) St. Louis City 2
8	Sporting Kansas City (Note: Philadelphia Union → Colorado Rapids → Sporting Kansas Ciy. Colorado Rapids acquired the natural first and third round picks in the 2025 MLS Super Draft and the natural first, second and third round in the 2026 and 2027 MLS SuperDrafts from Philadelphia Union in exchange for $125,000 in 2025 GAM, $125,000 in 2026 GAM, $100,000 in 2027 GAM and $250,000 in conditional GAM. Subsequently, Sporting Kansas City acquired the 8th overall pick in the 2025 MLS SuperDraft and $162,500 in 2025 GAM in exchange for their own natural first round pick.)	(United States) Jansen Miller	Senior	DF	Indiana	Big Ten	St. Louis Scott Gallagher SC	Saint Louis FC; St. Louis Scott Gallagher SC; Ocean City Nor'easters	(United States) Sporting Kansas City
9	Charlotte FC (Note: Toronto FC → San Diego FC → Charlotte FC. San Diego FC acquired the natural first round pick in the 2025 MLS Super Draft and up to $250,000 in conditional GAM from Toronto FC in exchange for Thiago Andrade. Subsequently, Charlotte FC acquired the ninth overall pick in the 2025 MLS SuperDraft from San Diego FC in exchange for their own natural first round pick in the 2025 MLS SuperDraft and $100,000 in 2025 GAM.)	(United States) Mikah Thomas	Sophomore	DF	UConn	Big East	Jacksonville Armada	—N/a	(United States) Charlotte FC
10	D.C. United	(United States) Hakim Karamoko	Sophomore	FW	NC State	ACC	Manhattan SC	Manhattan SC	(United States) D.C. United
11	FC Dallas	(United States) Enzo Newman	Sophomore	DF	Oregon State	WCC	Murieta Soccer Academy	—N/a	(United States) FC Dallas
12	Colorado Rapids (Note: Austin FC → Colorado Rapids. Colorado Rapids acquired the natural first round pick in the 2025 MLS SuperDraft and $75,000 in 2026 GAM from Austin FC in exchange for a 2025 International Slot.)	(United States) Efetobo Aror	Sophomore	MF	Portland	WCC	Barca Residency Academy	Phoenix Rising FC	Portland
13	CF Montréal	(Nigeria) Michael Adedokun	Senior	MF	Ohio State	Big Ten	—N/a	Fort Wayne FC	(Canada) CF Montréal
14	Portland Timbers	(United States) Ian Smith	Junior	DF	Denver	Summit	Real Colorado	Green Bay Voyageurs	(United States) Portland Timbers
15	Vancouver Whitecaps FC	(United States) Tate Johnson	Freshman	DF	North Carolina	ACC	Tampa Bay United SC	Tampa Bay Rowdies; Crown Legacy FC	(Canada) Vancouver Whitecaps FC
16	Colorado Rapids	(Canada) Sydney Wathuta	Sophomore	FW	Vermont	America East	Vancouver Whitecaps FC	Vermont Green FC	(United States) Colorado Rapids 2
17	New York City FC (Note: Charlotte FC → San Diego FC → New York City FC. San Diego FC acquired the natural first round pick in the 2025 MLS SuperDraft and $100,000 in 2025 GAM from Charlotte FC in exchange for the ninth overall pick in the 2025 MLS SuperDraft. Subsequently, New York City FC acquired the seventeenth overall pick in the 2025 MLS SuperDraft from San Diego FC in exchange for their own natural 2025 first round pick and $75,000 in 2025 GAM.)	(United States) Max Murray	Senior	DF	Vermont	America East	—N/a	Seacoast United Phantoms; FC Motown	(United States) New York City FC
18	New England Revolution (Note: Houston Dynamo FC → New England Revolution. New England Revolution acquired the natural first round pick in the 2025 MLS SuperDraft from Houston Dynamo FC in exchange for $75,000 in 2025 GAM.)	(United States) Donovan Parisian	Sophomore	GK	San Diego	WCC	AYSO United SC	FC Arizona; Arizona Arsenal SC	(United States) New England Revolution
19	Real Salt Lake	(Spain) Jesús Barea	Senior	FW	Missouri State	Missouri Valley	Cádiz	—N/a	(United States) Real Salt Lake
20	LA Galaxy (Note: FC Cincinnati → LA Galaxy. LA Galaxy acquired the natural first round pick in the 2025 MLS Super Draft and a conditional $50,000 in 2025 GAM from FC Cincinnati in exchange for the Right of First Refusal to sign Teenage Hadebe.)	(United States) Jason Bucknor	Senior	DF	Michigan	Big Ten	Weston FC; Inter Miami CF	Fort Lauderdale CF	(United States) Ventura County FC
21	Real Salt Lake (Note: Columbus Crew → Real Salt Lake. Real Salt Lake acquired the natural first round pick in the 2025 MLS SuperDraft from Columbus Crew in exchange for $75,000 in 2025 GAM.)	(United States) Max Kerkvliet	Freshman	GK	UConn	Big East	Albion Hurricanes FC	—N/a	(United States) Real Salt Lake
22	Los Angeles FC (Note: Inter Miami CF → Los Angeles FC. Los Angeles FC acquired the natural first round pick in the 2025 MLS SuperDraft from Inter Miami CF in exchange for $50,000 in 2025 GAM and their own natural second-round pick in the 2026 MLS SuperDraft.)	(United States) Alec Hughes	Senior	FW	UMass	A-10	FSA FC	Western Mass Pioneers; Hartford City FC	(United States) Los Angeles FC 2
23	Toronto FC (Note: Atlanta United FC → D.C. United → Toronto FC. D.C. United acquired the natural first round pick in the 2025 MLS SuperDraft from Atlanta United FC in exchange for Mateusz Klich. Subsequently, Toronto FC acquired the 23rd overall pick from D.C. United in exchange for $50,000 in 2025 GAM and $50,000 in conditional GAM.)	(United States) Reid Fisher	Sophomore	DF	San Diego State	WAC	Slammers FC	Vermont Green FC	(Canada) Toronto FC II
24	San Diego FC (Note: New York City FC → San Diego FC. San Diego FC acquired the natural first round pick in the 2025 MLS SuperDraft and $75,000 in 2025 GAM from New York City FC in exchange for the 17th overall pick in the 2025 MLS SuperDraft.)	(United States) Ian Pilcher	Senior	DF	Charlotte	American	Charlotte Soccer Academy	Grove Soccer United	(United States) San Diego FC
25	Minnesota United FC	(United States) Roman Torres	Junior	MF	Creighton	Big East	FC Dallas	North Texas SC; Tulsa Athletic	(United States) Minnesota United FC 2
26	Colorado Rapids (Note: Los Angeles FC → Vancouver Whitecaps FC → Colorado Rapids. Vancouver Whitecaps FC acquired the natural first round pick in the 2025 MLS SuperDraft, $250,000 in 2022 GAM, and $250,000 in 2023 GAM and $500,000 in conditional GAM from Los Angeles FC in exchange for Maxime Crépeau. Subsequently, the Colorado Rapids acquired the lesser of Los Angeles or Vancouver's natural first-round picks in the 2025 MLS SuperDraft, Vancouver's natural third-round pick in 2025 and $150,000 in conditional 2025 GAM from Vancouver Whitecaps FC in exchange for Ralph Priso.)	(United States) Josh Copeland	Sophomore	MF	Detroit Mercy	Horizon	Liverpool FC International Academy Michigan	Union FC Macomb	(United States) Colorado Rapids 2
27	Orlando City SC	(France) Joran Gerbet	Senior	MF	Clemson	ACC	FC Eyrieux Embroye; Rhône Crussol Foot 07; Valence; AJ Auxerre	—N/a	(United States) Orlando City SC
28	Seattle Sounders FC	(United States) Ryan Baer	Senior	MF	West Virginia	SBC	Carolina Rapids; Charlotte Independence	Charlotte Independence; Asheville City SC	(United States) Tacoma Defiance
29	Real Salt Lake (Note: New York Red Bulls → Real Salt Lake. Real Salt Lake acquired Elias Manoel, all three natural picks in the 2025 MLS SuperDraft and the 2026 MLS SuperDraft natural second round pick from New York Red Bulls in exchange for $550,000 in 2025 GAM and $150,000 in 2026 GAM.)	(Brazil) Lineker Rodrigues dos Santos	Senior	FW	Marshall	SBC	Dynamos SC	AHFC Royals	(United States) Real Monarchs
30	Real Salt Lake (Note: LA Galaxy → Real Salt Lake. Real Salt Lake acquired the natural first round pick in the 2025 MLS SuperDraft from LA Galaxy in exchange for $50,000 in 2025 GAM.)	(Spain) Sergi Solans	Freshman	FW	Oregon State	WCC	Girona; Peralada del Girona	Lane United FC	UCLA

=== Second round ===
P	MLS team	Player	Year	Pos.	College	Conference	Academy team(s)	Other team(s)	Signed
31	San Diego FC	(United States) Harrison Bertos	Sophomore	DF	Washington	Big Ten	Seacoast United	Seacoast United Phantoms	Washington
32	San Jose Earthquakes	(United States) Nick Fernandez	Junior	MF	Portland	WCC	Barca Residency Academy	Chicago City SC; River Light FC	(United States) San Jose Earthquakes
33	Chicago Fire FC	(United States) Travis Smith Jr.	Sophomore	DF	Wake Forest	ACC	FC Cincinnati; Louisville City FC	Louisville City FC	Wake Forest
34	Sporting Kansas City	(United States) Anthony Samways	Senior	DF	Ohio State	Big Ten	Columbus Crew	Kings Hammer FC	(United States) Sporting Kansas City II
35	New England Revolution	(United States) Eric Howard	Sophomore	DF	Georgetown	Big East	Crossfire Premier	Crossfire Redmond	Georgetown
36	Nashville SC	(United States) Alioune Ka	Senior	FW	Cornell	Ivy	Solar SC	Texas United	(United States) Huntsville City FC
37	St. Louis City SC	(United States) Joey Zalinsky	Senior	DF	Rutgers	Big Ten	New York Red Bulls	New York Red Bulls II; Jackson Lions FC	(United States) St. Louis City SC
38	Colorado Rapids (Note: Philadelphia Union → Colorado Rapids. Colorado Rapids acquired the natural second round pick in the 2025 MLS Super Draft from Philadelphia Union in exchange for the college protected rights to Oliver Semmle.)	(Australia) Charlie Harper	Junior	DF	North Carolina	ACC	Tokyo Musashino United	Asheville City SC	(United States) Colorado Rapids 2
39	Toronto FC	(United States) Michael Sullivan	Senior	MF	Pittsburgh	ACC	Century United; Arsenal FC of PA	Steel City FC	(Canada) Toronto FC II
40	D.C. United	(United States) Daniel Ittycheria	Junior	FW	Princeton	Ivy	PDA	FC Motown	Princeton
41	FC Dallas	(United States) Sam Sarver	Senior	FW	Indiana	Big Ten	Columbus Crew	FC Motown; Akron City FC	(United States) North Texas SC
42	Austin FC	(United States) Riley Thomas	Senior	DF	North Carolina	ACC	Southern Soccer Academy	—N/a	(United States) Austin FC II
43	Minnesota United FC (Note: CF Montréal → Minnesota United FC. Minnesota United FC acquired the natural second round pick in the 2025 MLS Super Draft and $50,000 in 2024 GAM from CF Montréal in exchange for Caden Clark.)	(United States) Kieran Chandler	Sophomore	DF	UConn	Big East	Oakwood SC	Long Island Rough Riders; Hartford City FC	(United States) Minnesota United FC 2
44	CF Montréal (Note: Portland Timbers → CF Montréal. CF Montréal acquired the natural second round pick in the 2025 MLS Super Draft and up to $200,000 in conditional GAM from Portland Timbers in exchange for Mason Toye.)	(United States) Arik Duncan	Senior	FW	California	ACC	SSA Chelsea; Concorde Fire	Project 51O	
45	Vancouver Whitecaps FC	(United States) Nikola Djordjevic	Junior	DF	SMU	ACC	Capital City SC	—N/a	(Canada) Whitecaps FC 2
46	Orlando City SC (Note: Colorado Rapids → Real Salt Lake → Orlando City SC. Real Salt Lake acquired the natural second round pick in the 2025 MLS Super Draft and a 2024 international roster slot from Colorado Rapids in exchange for Jasper Löffelsend. Subsequently, Orlando City SC acquired the pick as part of the Right of First Refusal to former Benji Michel.)	(Dominica) Titus Sandy Jr	Senior	DF	Clemson	ACC	Charlotte Soccer Academy	Charlottetowne Hops FC	(United States) Orlando City B
47	Charlotte FC	(United States) Andrew Johnson	Junior	DF	Cornell	Ivy	FC DELCO	Reading United AC	Cornell
48	Houston Dynamo FC	(United States) Bo Cummins	Senior	DF	Wake Forest	ACC	Minnesota United FC; New York Red Bulls	New York Red Bulls II; Ocean City Nor'easters; Charlotte Eagles; Albion SC Colorado	
49	Real Salt Lake	(United States) Nick Dang	Junior	DF	Virginia	ACC	Nashville United Soccer Academy	Tennessee SC	Virginia
50	CF Montréal (Note: FC Cincinnati → CF Montréal. CF Montréal acquired the natural second round pick in the 2025 MLS Super Draft from FC Cincinnati in exchange for $50,000 in 2025 GAM.)	(United States) Caden Grabfelder	Sophomore	FW	Penn State	Big Ten	FC DELCO; Philadelphia Union	Lehigh Valley United	Penn State
51	Columbus Crew	(United States) Cesar Ruvalcaba	Senior	DF	SMU	ACC	Downey FC United; Strikers FC	Thunder Bay Chill; Redlands FC	(United States) Columbus Crew
52	Inter Miami CF	(United States) Bailey Sparks	Senior	MF	SMU	ACC	Solar SC; Sporting Kansas City	Sporting Kansas City II; Texas United	(United States) Inter Miami CF II
53	Atlanta United FC	(New Zealand) Ronan Wynne	Senior	DF	Denver	Summit	Wellington Phoenix FC	Albion FC Colorado	(United States) Atlanta United 2
54	New York City FC	(United States) Collin McCamy	Senior	MF	Northwestern	Big Ten	Triangle United SA; Wake FC; North Carolina FC	North Carolina FC; RKC Third Coast	(United States) New York City FC II
55	Minnesota United FC	(United States) Logan Dorsey	Senior	FW	Kentucky	SBC	Colorado Rapids	Colorado Springs Switchbacks FC	(United States) Minnesota United FC 2
56	San Diego FC (Note: Los Angeles FC → San Diego FC. San Diego FC acquired the natural second round pick in the 2025 MLS SuperDraft and Tomás Ángel from Los Angeles FC in exchange for $200,000 in 2025 GAM.)	(United States) Samy Kanaan	Junior	FW	San Diego	WCC	San Diego SC	Ventura County Fusion	San Diego
57	Orlando City SC	(Ghana) Collins Oduro	Sophomore	FW	Indiana	Big Ten	Right to Dream Academy	—N/a	Indiana
58	Seattle Sounders FC	(United States) Demian Alvarez	Senior	DF	Seattle	WAC	Pacific Northwest SC	Ballard FC	(United States) Tacoma Defiance
59	Real Salt Lake (Note: New York Red Bulls → Real Salt Lake. Real Salt Lake acquired Elias Manoel, all three natural picks in the 2025 MLS SuperDraft and the 2026 MLS SuperDraft natural second round pick from New York Red Bulls in exchange for $550,000 in 2025 GAM and $150,000 in 2026 GAM.)	(United States) Trace Alphin	Senior	GK	Wake Forest	ACC	North Carolina FC	North Carolina FC U23	(United States) Real Monarchs
60	LA Galaxy	(United States) Jacob Woznicki	Senior	FW	Hofstra	CAA	Ajax Premier	Long Island Rough Riders	

=== Third round ===
P	MLS team	Player	Year	Pos.	College	Conference	Academy team(s)	Other team(s)	Signed
61	San Diego FC	(United States) Donovan Sessoms	Sophomore	FW	Sacramento State	Big West	Sacramento Republic FC	—N/a	Sacramento State
62f	Colorado Rapids (Note: San Jose Earthquakes → Colorado Rapids. Colorado Rapids acquired the natural third round pick in the 2025 MLS SuperDraft from San Jose Earthquakes in exchange for the signing rights to William Yarbrough.)	(Saint Lucia) Donavan Phillip	Sophomore	FW	NC State	ACC	—N/a	Kalamazoo FC	NC State
63	Chicago Fire FC	(South Africa) Geni Kanyane	Senior	DF	Dayton	A-10	Bidvest Wits	Des Moines Menace	(United States) Chicago Fire FC II
64	Sporting Kansas City	(Germany) Leon Koehl	Sophomore	MF	Maryland	Big Ten	Bayer Leverkusen	—N/a	Maryland
65	New England Revolution	(United States) C. J. Williams	Junior	DF	Boston College	ACC	Met Oval; New York City FC; New York Red Bulls	—N/a	Boston College
66	Nashville SC	(United States) Ethan Ballek	Junior	MF	South Carolina	SBC	Real Colorado	Albion SC Colorado	South Carolina
67	St. Louis City SC	(United States) Colin Welsh	Senior	GK	Western Michigan	Missouri Valley	Sporting Blue Valley Academy	Kaw Valley FC	(United States) St. Louis City 2
68	Colorado Rapids (Note: Philadelphia Union → Colorado Rapids. See Round 1: Philadelphia → Colorado Rapids.)	(United States) Shawn Smart	Junior	DF	Clemson	ACC	SIMA Gold	Las Vegas Lights FC	(United States) Las Vegas Lights FC
69	Toronto FC	(Liberia) Joseph Melto Quiah	Senior	FW	Dayton	A-10	Paynesville FC	LISCR FC	(Canada) Toronto FC II
70	D.C. United	(United States) Jonah Biggar	Sophomore	DF	South Carolina	SBC	Greenville Triumph SC	Greenville Triumph SC	South Carolina
71	FC Dallas	(Mali) Mohamed Cisset	Sophomore	DF	Penn State	Big Ten	Montverde Academy	—N/a	(United States) North Texas SC
72	Austin FC	(United States) Patrick Gryczewski	Senior	FW	Rhode Island	A-10	Ajax Connecticut	Western Mass Pioneers	(United States) Austin FC II
73	CF Montréal	(France) Arthur Duquenne	Sophomore	DF	Clemson	ACC	Amiens	—N/a	Clemson
74	Portland Timbers	(United States) Lukas Burns	Senior	GK	Providence	Big East	Philadelphia Union	—N/a	(United States) Portland Timbers 2
75	Colorado Rapids (Note: Vancouver Whitecaps → Colorado Rapids. See Round 1: Los Angeles FC → Vancouver Whitecaps → Colorado Rapids.)	(United States) Matthew Van Horn	Sophomore	MF	Georgetown	Big East	Shattuck-Saint Mary's	—N/a	Georgetown
76	Seattle Sounders FC (Note: Colorado Rapids → Seattle Sounders FC. Seattle Sounders FC acquired the natural third round pick in the 2025 MLS Super Draft and $92,000 in GAM from Colorado Rapids in exchange for a loan of Danny Leyva.)	(United States) Trace Terry	Junior	FW	Bowling Green	Missouri Valleey	Columbus Crew	Toledo Villa FC	Bowling Green
77	Charlotte FC	(United States) Barzee Blama	Sophomore	FW	Mercer	SoCon	—N/a	Flint City Bucks	(United States) Crown Legacy FC
78	New York City FC (Note: Houston Dynamo FC → New York City FC. New York City FC acquired the natural third round pick in the 2025 MLS Super Draft and a sell on percentage from Houston Dynamo FC in exchange for Gabriel Segal.)	(Denmark) A. J. Smith	Sophomore	FW	Virginia	ACC	Fremad Amager	Fremad Amager	Virginia
79	Real Salt Lake	(United States) Liam O'Gara	Sophomore	MF	Wake Forest	ACC	North Carolina Fusion	—N/a	(United States) Real Monarchs
80	FC Cincinnati	(United States) Ben Augee	Junior	MF	Gonzaga	WCC	Portland Timbers	United PDX	(United States) FC Cincinnati 2
81	Columbus Crew	(United States) Drew Kerr	Junior	FW	Duke	ACC	North Carolina FC	North Carolina FC; North Carolina FC U23	Duke
82	Inter Miami CF	(Ghana) Michael Appiah	Senior	FW	FIU	American	—N/a	Miami AC	
83	Atlanta United FC	(Norway) William Kulvik	Senior	DF	Maryland	Big Ten	Stabæk	Stabæk	
84	New York City FC	(Spain) Arnau Farnós	Junior	FW	Oregon State	WCC	FC Barcelona; RC Celta de Vigo; Girona FC	Lane United FC	Oregon State
85	Minnesota United FC	(United States) Nick Collins	Sophomore	DF	Rutgers	Big Ten	Players Development Academy	FC Motown	Rutgers
86	D.C. United (Note: Los Angeles FC → D.C. United. D.C. United acquired the natural third round pick in the 2025 MLS Super Draft from Los Angeles FC in exchange for the Right of First Refusal for David Ochoa.)	(United States) Grant Bailey	Sophomore	DF	Loyola Chicago	A-10	Indy Eleven	—N/a	Loyola Chicago
87	Orlando City SC	(Japan) Takahiro Fujita	Sophomore	DF	Marshall	SBC	Cerezo Osaka	—N/a	Marshall
88	New York City FC (Note: Seattle Sounders FC → New York City FC. New York City FC acquired the natural third-round pick in the 2025 MLS SuperDraft from Seattle Sounders FC in exchange for the College Protected Period Priority for Braudilio Rodriguez.)	(United States) Nico Cavallo	Senior	DF	UCLA	Big Ten	Richmond Strikers	Long Island Rough Riders; Asheville City SC	(United States) New York City FC
89	Real Salt Lake (Note: New York Red Bulls → Real Salt Lake. Real Salt Lake acquired Elias Manoel, all three natural picks in the 2025 MLS SuperDraft and the 2026 MLS SuperDraft natural second round pick from New York Red Bulls in exchange for $550,000 in 2025 GAM and $150,000 in 2026 GAM.)	(Serbia) Aleksandar Vuković	Senior	DF	Marshall	SBC	—N/a	Capo FC	Duke
90	LA Galaxy	(United States) Nicklaus Sullivan	Senior	FW	CSUSB	CCAA	—N/a	AMSG FC; Los Angeles FC 2	(United States) Ventura County FC

== Notable undrafted players ==
=== Homegrown players ===
This is a list of players who were draft eligible, but previously played on the Academy team of an MLS side, and were signed directly to the first team roster prior to the SuperDraft.

Original MLS team	Player	Position	College	Conference	Notes	Ref.
Atlanta United FC	(United States) Will Reilly	MF	Stanford	ACC		
New York City FC	(United States) Prince Amponsah	DF	Wake Forest	ACC		
Chicago Fire FC	(United States) Dylan Borso	MF	Wake Forest	ACC		

== Summary ==
=== Selections by college athletic conference ===
Conference	Round 1	Round 2	Round 3	Total
NCAA Division I conferences
A-10	2	0	4	6
ACC	3	12	7	22
America East	2	0	0	2
American	1	0	1	2
Big East	5	2	2	9
Big Ten	4	7	5	16
Big West	1	0	1	2
CAA	0	1	0	1
Horizon	1	0	0	1
Ivy	1	3	0	4
Missouri Valley	1	0	1	2
SoCon	0	0	1	1
Summit	1	1	0	2
SBC	2	1	4	7
WAC	1	1	0	2
WCC	5	2	2	9
NCAA Division II conference
CCAA	0	0	1	1

=== Schools with multiple draft selections ===
Selections	Schools
4	Clemson, Wake Forest
3	Cornell, Indiana, Marshall, North Carolina, Oregon State, SMU, UConn
2	Dayton, Denver, Georgetown, Maryland, NC State, Ohio State, Penn State, Portland, Rutgers, San Diego, South Carolina, Vermont, Virginia

== Trades ==
Round 1:

Round 2:

Round 3:
