= Mikey Varas =

American soccer coach (born 1982)

- Varas with San Diego FC in 2026

Personal information
- Full name: Michael Anthony Varas
- Date of birth: December 7, 1982 (age 43)
- Place of birth: Burlingame, California, U.S.

Team information
- Current team: San Diego FC (head coach)

Youth career
- Universidad Católica
- Naval

College career
Years	Team	Apps	(Gls)
2001–2004	San Francisco Dons		

Senior career*
Years	Team	Apps	(Gls)
2005	Santiago Wanderers		

Managerial career
- 2016–2017: Sacramento Republic (academy)
- 2017–2019: FC Dallas (academy)
- 2019–2021: FC Dallas (assistant)
- 2021–2023: United States U20
- 2023–2024: United States (assistant)
- 2024: United States (interim)
- 2025–: San Diego FC
- * Club domestic league appearances and goals as of 13:34, September 9, 2024 (UTC)

Michael Anthony Varas (born December 7, 1982) is an American soccer coach who is the head coach of Major League Soccer club San Diego FC. He was formerly an assistant coach with the United States men's national team and briefly served as its interim head coach in 2024.

== Early life and education ==
Mikey Varas was born and raised in the San Francisco Bay Area. He was born to a Chilean father and American mother. As a youth football player, he was with Universidad Católica and Naval while he lived in Chile. He played collegiate soccer for four years at the University of San Francisco. Following his college career, Varas spent a season with Santiago Wanderers in Chile. Despite a promising start as a player, Varas decided to transition into coaching shortly after his time in Chile. He holds a U.S. Soccer “A” Coaching License and is fluent in Spanish. Varas also earned a master’s degree in kinesiology with an emphasis in physical education from Fresno Pacific University.

== Coaching career ==
=== Early coaching career ===
Mikey Varas began his coaching journey in California, where he held various coaching positions that contributed to his development as a coach. His early career saw him take on roles such as Director of Coaching for Burlingame’s Gamer Futsal School and Regional Coordinator for the NorCal Premier Soccer Player Development Program. He also coached U-12, U-17, and U-19 teams at De Anza Force in the ECNL before joining the U.S. Soccer Development Academy.

=== Sacramento Republic and FC Dallas ===
In 2016, Varas joined the Sacramento Republic academy, where he was named U.S. Soccer Development Academy West Conference U-14 coach of the year after just one season. His success at Sacramento caught the attention of FC Dallas, where he was hired as the U-16 head coach in 2017.

Varas's work with FC Dallas quickly gained recognition, and in 2019, he was promoted to assistant coach for the first team under head coach Luchi Gonzalez. During his time with FC Dallas, the club made consecutive MLS Cup playoff appearances, bolstered by the contributions of several homegrown players such as Reggie Cannon, Paxton Pomykal, and Ricardo Pepi. Varas played a key role in developing these young talents, many of whom would later represent the senior U.S. men's national team.

=== United States ===
Varas was appointed head coach of the United States U-20 men's national team on November 5, 2021. His appointment was seen as a strategic move by U.S. Soccer, given his proven track record in youth development. In 2022, Varas led the U-20 team to victory in the CONCACAF U-20 Championship, securing the team's third consecutive title in the competition.

In the 2023 FIFA U-20 World Cup, the United States reached the quarterfinals before being eliminated by eventual champion Uruguay. Varas was praised for his ability to develop young talent and prepare them for higher levels of competition.

He was named interim head coach of the United States men's national team on September 1, 2024 amidst the program's search for a full-time replacement for Gregg Berhalter. Varas had scouted the USMNT's opponents during the 2022 FIFA World Cup. His record during his two-friendly stint was 0–1–1. His first match was a 2–1 loss at Children's Mercy Park on September 7 which was the second-ever defeat to Canada on home soil and the first since 1957. The other was a 1–1 draw with New Zealand at TQL Stadium on September 10. Mauricio Pochettino was announced as Varas' full-time successor just hours prior to the New Zealand contest.

=== San Diego FC ===
On September 16, 2024, Varas was named the first-ever head coach of Major League Soccer's San Diego FC, which began play in 2025.

== Coaching statistics ==
As of match played 7 November 2026

Coaching record by team and tenure
Team	Nat	From	To	Record							
Team	Nat	From	To	G	W	D	L	GF	GA	GD	Win %
United States U-20	(United States)	November 5, 2021	August 29, 2023	20	11	4	5	50	22	+28	55.00
United States (interim)	(United States)	September 1, 2024	September 11, 2024	2	0	1	1	2	3	−1	0.00
San Diego FC	(United States)	September 16, 2024	Present	83	36	18	29	148	128	+20	43.37
Total				105	47	23	35	200	153	+47	44.76

== Honors ==
=== Manager ===
United States U20

- CONCACAF U-20 Championship: 2022
