= San Diego FC =

American professional soccer club based in San Diego

- Full name: San Diego Football Club
- Short name: SDFC
- Founded: May 18, 2023; 3 years ago
- Stadium: Snapdragon Stadium; San Diego, California
- Capacity: 35,000
- Owner: Mohamed Mansour; Sycuan Band of the Kumeyaay Nation
- CEO: Tom Penn
- Head coach: Mikey Varas
- League: Major League Soccer
- 2026: Western Conference: 13th Overall: 25th Playoffs: Did not qualify
- Website: sandiegofc.com
Home colors	Away colors

San Diego Football Club is an American professional soccer club based in San Diego. The club competes in Major League Soccer (MLS) as a member of the Western Conference. The team plays its home matches at Snapdragon Stadium. The club's ownership group is led by British-Egyptian businessman and former politician Mohamed Mansour and the Sycuan Band of the Kumeyaay Nation, a federally recognized Native American tribe. The group was awarded an expansion team on May 18, 2023. The club began play in the 2025 season as the 30th in MLS.

== History ==
San Diego FC Starting XI in 2026

=== First-division soccer in San Diego ===
San Diego's earliest professional soccer team was the short-lived San Diego Toros, a North American Soccer League (NASL) team that relocated from Los Angeles in 1968 and played a single season. A second NASL team, the San Diego Jaws, was established in 1976 from the former Baltimore Comets and played one year before moving to Las Vegas; the club returned in 1978 and was renamed the Sockers, playing outdoor matches at Jack Murphy Stadium, which was shared with the National Football League's San Diego Chargers and Major League Baseball's San Diego Padres. The Sockers had poor attendance but survived the folding of the NASL by moving to the Major Indoor Soccer League, where they won eight championships in nine seasons. The team moved to the Continental Indoor Soccer League in 1993 and folded in 1997; the name was later revived for a second indoor team from 2001 to 2004 and a third indoor team that began play in 2009. Other outdoor teams, including the San Diego Flash and San Diego 1904 FC, had played short stints in the lower divisions of American soccer in the 2000s and 2010s before folding.

=== Previous MLS bids ===
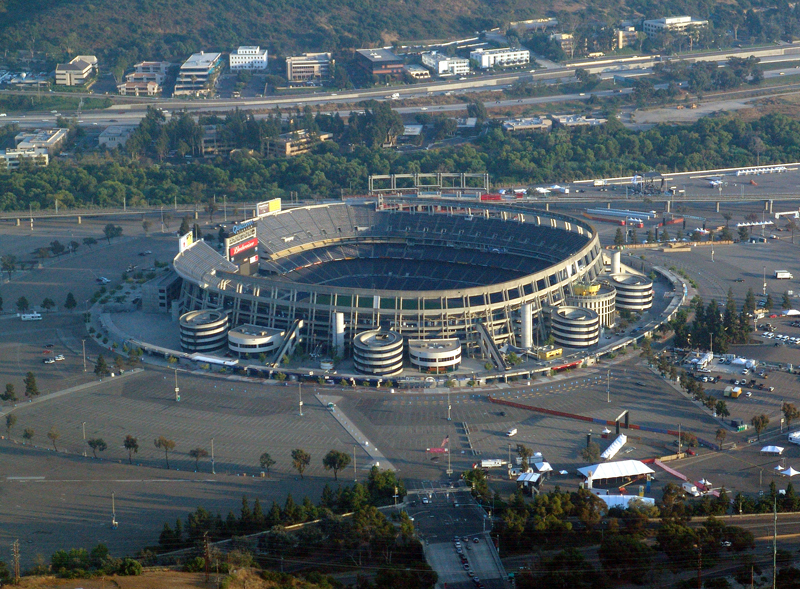
Qualcomm Stadium hosted the 1999 MLS All-Star Game and was a factor in several San Diego expansion bids.

During the formation of MLS in the mid-1990s, San Diego was not among the U.S. cities to formally submit a bid for a team in the inaugural season, but expressed interest and held several meetings with the league. MLS commissioner Doug Logan described San Diego as a "prime candidate" for an expansion team, but the city's lack of a suitable stadium to accommodate soccer was a "major hurdle"; at the time, Jack Murphy Stadium was shared with the Padres and had a larger capacity than the league's desired size. The renovated Jack Murphy Stadium (renamed Qualcomm Stadium) hosted several exhibition matches and the 1999 MLS All-Star Game, which drew an attendance of 23,277; it was the only MLS All-Star Game to be played outside of an active or future MLS market.

Following the approval of plans to build a downtown ballpark for the Padres, the MLS expansion committee voiced its support of a potential team playing at Qualcomm Stadium—either permanently or until a soccer-specific stadium was built. The San Diego market was considered for Chivas USA, an MLS expansion team that later served as a reserve team for C.D. Guadalajara of the Mexican Primera División. The team instead shared its home venue with the LA Galaxy in Carson, California, and played for 10 seasons before folding for low attendance and ownership issues. The league continued to list San Diego as a potential candidate for expansion and negotiated with several interested investor groups, but the lack of a suitable stadium prevented further consideration. Balboa Stadium, the 1960s home of the Chargers and Jaws, was also mentioned as a potential site for a smaller stadium built for an MLS team.

A new team across the Mexican border, Club Tijuana (nicknamed the Xolos), was founded in 2007 and promoted to Liga MX—Mexico's top-flight league—in 2011. The team attracted support from fans in San Diego—about 20 miles (32 km) north of its home stadium—and played several exhibition matches in the area at various venues, including Qualcomm Stadium and the Padres' Petco Park. San Diego also remained one of the top U.S. viewing markets for television broadcasts of the FIFA World Cup, Premier League, and other overseas soccer competitions. The area had also produced several prominent players for the United States men's and women's national teams.

The San Diego Chargers announced plans to relocate to the Los Angeles area in 2015 while it also pursued a new downtown San Diego stadium, which required voter approval but was rejected. The team's departure was made official in early 2017 and opened an opportunity for a new MLS expansion bid to be led by businessman Mike Stone with several other investors, including Padres owner Peter Seidler and former soccer player Landon Donovan. A separate bid from former Padres owner John Moores—who had shown interest in an MLS team in the 1990s—and an unspecified Premier League team was withdrawn a year earlier. The Stone bid proposed a redevelopment of the Qualcomm Stadium site named "SoccerCity" that would include mixed-use development and a park surrounding a stadium shared with San Diego State University (SDSU)'s athletic teams, known as the Aztecs. The stadium would seat 20,000 to 32,000 spectators and cost $200 million to construct. A separate proposal from SDSU, named SDSU West, was announced and placed on the same November 2018 ballot; SoccerCity was defeated with 30 percent of votes, while SDSU West earned 55 percent approval.

A second-division team, San Diego Loyal SC, was established by Warren Smith and Landon Donovan in 2019 and began play the following year in the USL Championship at Torero Stadium. The team also showed interest in launching an MLS expansion with other partners, but were not part of any later bids. The SDSU West stadium, named Snapdragon Stadium, opened in 2022 and became the home of San Diego Wave FC, a National Women's Soccer League expansion team that moved from Torero Stadium. The team set several U.S. women's soccer attendance records in its first season and drew 32,000 fans at the new Snapdragon Stadium. Several investor groups also approached SDSU to launch a MLS expansion team that would play at Snapdragon Stadium with financial concessions requested by the league. A separate proposal to build a mixed-use residential and hotel district in the suburb of Chula Vista with a soccer-specific stadium was announced in April 2023 by Petra Development Group and outside investors.

=== Mansour–Sycuan bid ===
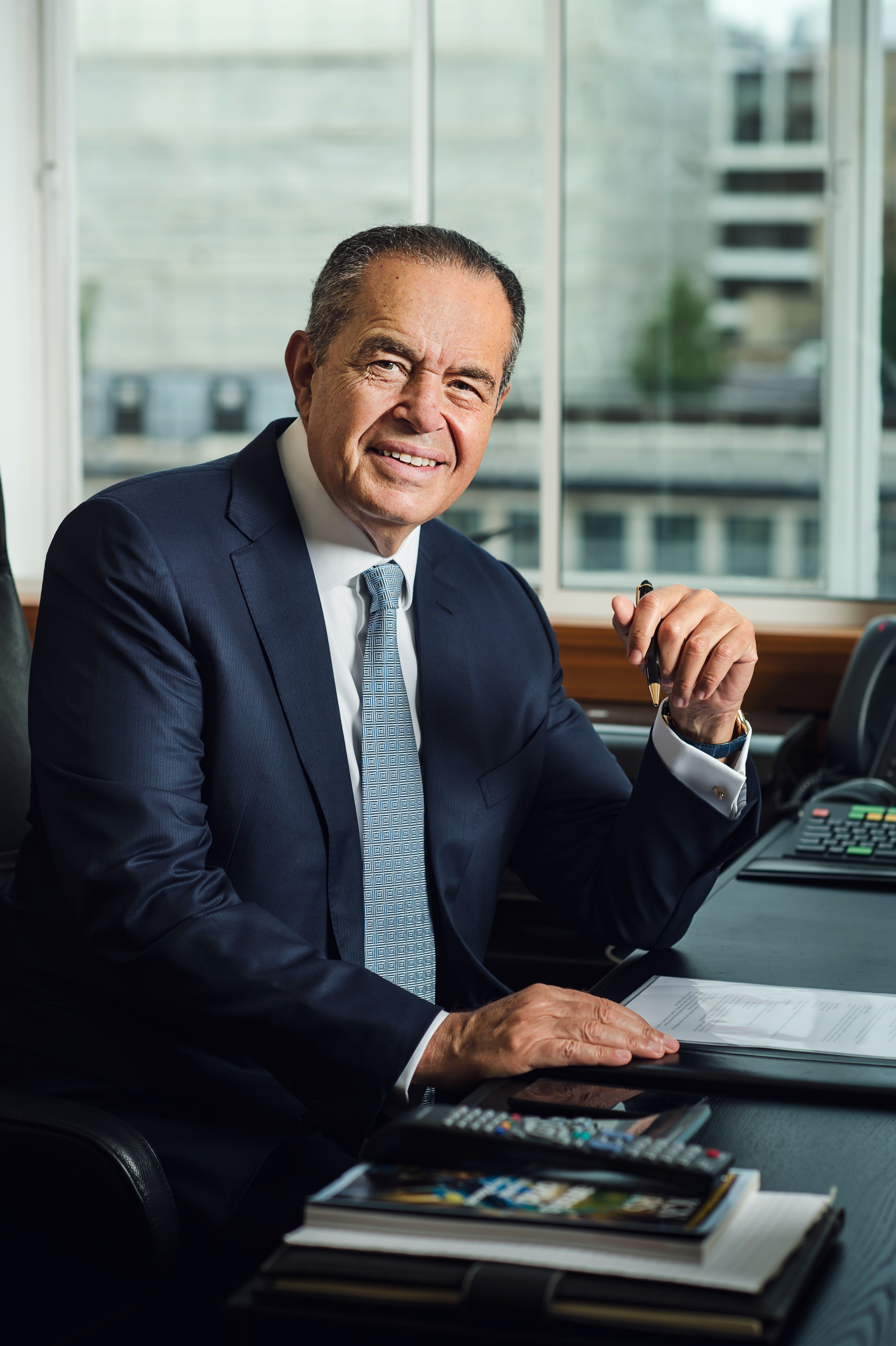
Mohamed Mansour joined the Sycuan Band of the Kumeyaay Nation to bid for an MLS expansion team in 2022

The Sycuan Band of the Kumeyaay Nation, a federally recognized Native American tribe and operators of local entertainment venues, began looking for opportunities to invest in sports ownership in December 2020. The tribe partnered with developer Brad Termini to bid for an MLS expansion team the following year and searched for a major financial partner with help from the league. The Sycuan Tribe contacted the Mansour Group, led by businessman Mohamed Mansour, who joined the bid in late 2022. In October 2022, The San Diego Union-Tribune reported that the proposed team would require an agreement with SDSU to use Snapdragon Stadium. San Diego competed with proposals from Las Vegas, who had previously been described as the "favorite" to become the 30th MLS team; the primary Las Vegas bid, led by Wes Edens and Nassef Sawiris, who co-owned Aston Villa F.C. in the Premier League, included a conceptual indoor stadium.

On May 18, 2023, at a Snapdragon Stadium event, MLS announced that the expansion team had been awarded to San Diego and would be owned by Mansour and the Sycuan Tribe. The ownership group paid a $500 million expansion fee according to media reports. Within a day, a total of 5,000 season ticket deposits had been sold. The team's name, San Diego Football Club, and colors were unveiled at an event on October 20. San Diego FC began to play in 2025, giving the state of California four clubs in MLS. The team's first player, former Loyal SC goalkeeper Duran Ferree, was signed in December 2023 and loaned to Orange County SC for the 2024 season.

San Diego FC announced a five-year partnership with Club Tijuana in May 2024 that will include an annual friendly match between the two teams called the Baja Cup, hosted in San Diego. It is the first partnership of its kind between individual MLS and Liga MX clubs. The team signed their first Designated Player, Mexico international and forward Hirving "Chucky" Lozano from PSV Eindhoven, to a four-year contract in June. Lozano remained with PSV until the first San Diego FC training camp in January 2025. San Diego FC selected five players during the 2024 MLS expansion draft, which took place at the Mission Valley shopping mall on December 11. Three of the players were retained by the club, while two selections were traded to other MLS teams.

=== Inaugural season ===
The team's first match was on February 23, 2025, at Dignity Health Sports Park against defending MLS Cup champions LA Galaxy. San Diego FC won 2–0 with two goals from Anders Dreyer; an estimated 1,000 supporters had traveled to Dignity Health Sports Park to support the team. The first home match at Snapdragon Stadium was March 1, 2025, against St. Louis City SC; a 0–0 tie in front of 34,506 fans, it marked largest crowd for a sporting event in the stadium's history. However, the match was marred by instances of the homophobic "puto" chant throughout, leading to a joint campaign by the club and the San Diego Independent Supporters Union to prevent the chant at future home games – adopting the phrase "Not here" (Spanish: Aquí No).

The team finished first in the Western Conference in their inaugural season and earned 63 points, breaking a record for expansion teams in MLS. In their first playoff game, San Diego FC defeated the Portland Timbers 2–1 at Snapdragon Stadium on October 26, with goals from Onni Valakari and Anders Dreyer. The team then lost their second match and won 4–0 in the third to clinch the best-of-three series against Portland. San Diego FC were ultimately eliminated in the Western Conference final in a 3–1 home loss to Vancouver Whitecaps FC. Dreyer was named MLS Newcomer of the Year and was a finalist for the league's most valuable player award. During the offseason, San Diego FC announced that Hirving "Chucky" Lozano would be transferred as part of an agreement to mutually part ways.

== Club identity ==
The team's crest comprises a shield in the club's official colors—chrome and azul—surrounded by a gradient band of blue, red, orange, and yellow. At the center of the shield is a circular design, named "The Flow", with 18 lines that represent the 18 cities of San Diego County. At the top of the shield is an arch with the "San Diego" wordmark, representing monumental signs that adorn the city's neighborhoods.

San Diego FC contracted with Pupila, a Costa Rican design consultant, to develop the club's identity. A series of secondary logos with "The Flow" and an "SD" wordmark were also part of the unveiling. San Diego FC had been used as a working name and placeholder at the time of the expansion announcement in May 2023; the team is the eleventh in MLS to use the "FC" suffix. The name and crest, which were leaked by The Athletic a day prior to the October unveiling, garnered a generally negative initial reception online, particularly the crest. The team's merchandise at the event sold out and was supplemented by the opening of a pop-up space at the Mission Valley shopping center in November.

The team's first jersey was unveiled on December 13, 2024. It consists of a dark "azul" background with white trim and a "gradient piping" of red to blue on the sides. The secondary jersey is white with navy blue and light blue accents and was released in February 2025 under the name "Woven Into One". Future editions of the secondary jersey are planned to showcase local artists under the "Community Kit" program.

=== Sponsorship ===
Period	Kit manufacturer	Shirt sponsor	Sleeve sponsor
2025–present	Adidas	DirecTV	Adriana's Insurance

The team announced their first jersey sponsorship with El Segundo-based DirecTV on July 18, 2024. The first sleeve sponsor, Adriana's Insurance, was announced in November 2025.

== Stadium and facilities ==
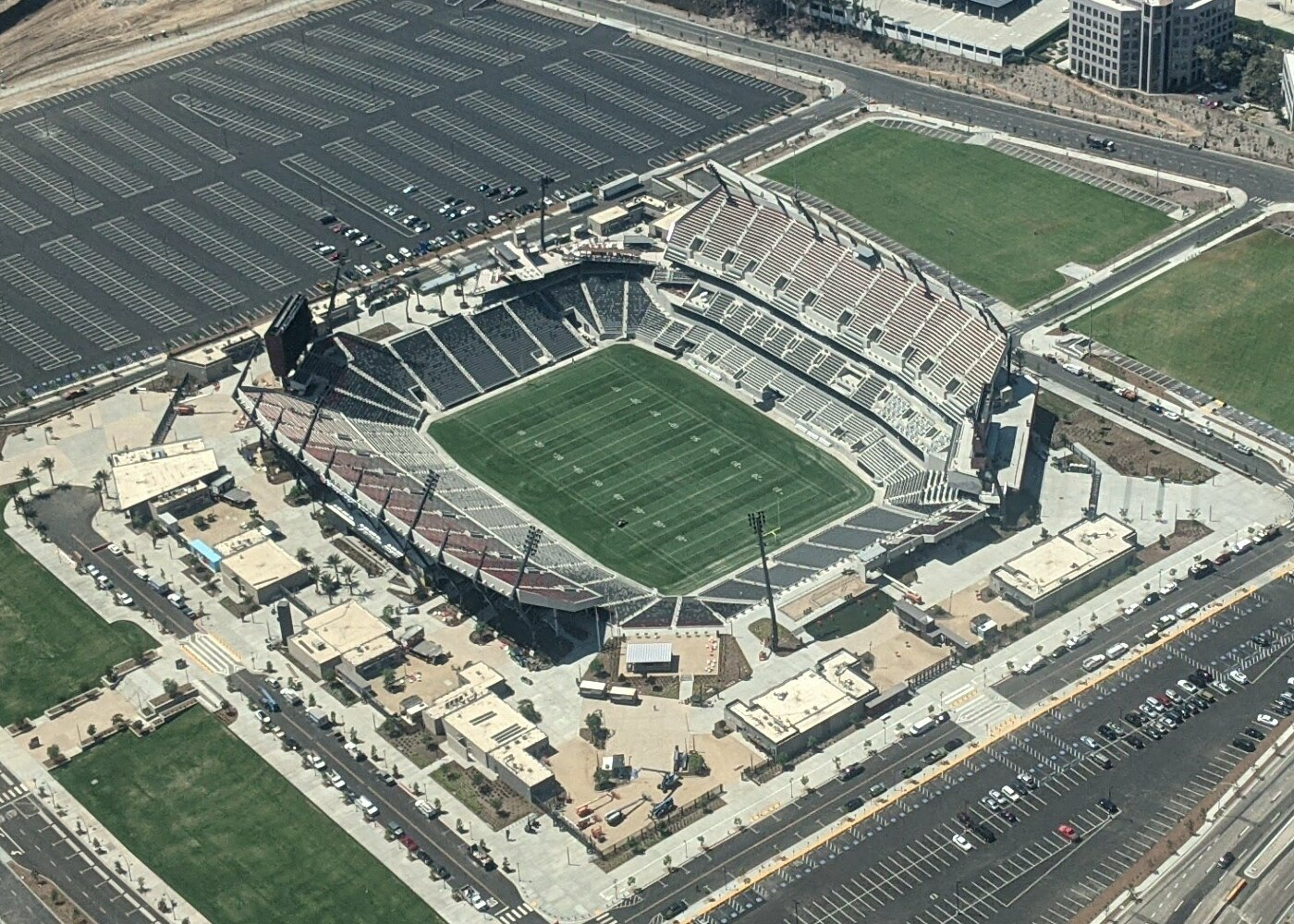
Aerial view of Snapdragon Stadium, the team's home venue

San Diego FC plays home matches at Snapdragon Stadium, a 35,000-seat outdoor venue that opened in 2022 at the former site of San Diego Stadium. The stadium is located on the campus of San Diego State University at SDSU Mission Valley and is primarily used by the university for Aztecs college football games. It is also home to San Diego Wave FC of the National Women's Soccer League (NWSL). The stadium has also hosted international friendlies and CONCACAF competitions since 2023, including the 2024 CONCACAF W Gold Cup final.

Snapdragon Stadium was built to soccer specifications with various fixtures that meet MLS standards; the stadium's seating capacity is larger than most soccer-specific stadiums, but lacks a roof or other weather protection. The natural grass surface, which had been criticized during Wave matches and football games, was switched to Bermuda grass in January 2025 and is scheduled to be replaced again in August or September. The stadium also has 20 luxury suites and 260 pitchside seats. According to The San Diego Union-Tribune, San Diego FC signed a lease agreement in May 2023 with San Diego State University for use of the stadium, which is expected to cost $200,000 per match. The team would share the locker rooms with the university's football team and have scheduling priority behind them, but ahead of San Diego Wave FC. The club will also receive $1.75 million from the stadium naming rights paid by Qualcomm as part of the lease agreement.

The team's training facility is the Sharp HealthCare Performance Center on the Sycuan Reservation east of El Cajon. The 28-acre (11 ha) site, adjacent to the Singing Hills Golf Resort, includes a 50,000 square feet (4,600 m^{2}) building with five full-size fields and one half field—all shared between the senior team and the Right to Dream youth academy. It began construction in November 2023 and opened on February 4, 2025. Up to 100 youth players in the academy will have living quarters and classrooms at the campus; the former Singing Hills Hotel was planned to be renovated into dormitories for academy players and staff. The team's headquarters are at a leased space in the Little Italy neighborhood of San Diego.

== Ownership and management ==
The team is owned by Mohamed Mansour, a British-Egyptian businessman and politician, and the Sycuan Band of the Kumeyaay Nation. The Mansour Group also owns Danish club FC Nordsjælland and the Right to Dream youth academy, which has facilities in Ghana, Egypt, and Denmark. A branch of the Right to Dream Academy is planned to be opened in El Cajon with residential facilities for 120 to 160 players, according to The San Diego Union-Tribune. The Sycuan Band are the first Native American tribe to own part of a professional soccer team in the United States and the second to have an ownership stake in any professional sports team after the Mohegan Tribe in Connecticut, owners of the Connecticut Sun. The ownership group also includes Padres player Manny Machado, developer Brad Termini, and several Right to Dream executives. On November 20, 2024, the club announced that Spanish footballer Juan Mata joined their ownership group. In February 2025, the club announced that Tems has joined the ownership group.

San Diego FC's first head coach is Mikey Varas, who was appointed in September 2024. He had been the interim coach of the United States men's national team for two matches and had previously coached the United States under-20 team. Tom Penn was named the club's chief executive officer on May 18, 2023; he was previously president of Los Angeles FC during their launch. By late 2024, San Diego FC had 70 employees at their headquarters.

== Club culture ==
San Diego FC has seven officially recognized supporters groups that form the Frontera SD, which was allocated 3,000 safe standing seats at Snapdragon Stadium by the club.

== Broadcasting ==
All of the club's regular season matches are broadcast globally on MLS Season Pass, an online streaming service operated under the Apple TV brand. The English radio broadcast is carried by KGB (760 AM) with play-by-play commentary from Adrian Garcia Marquez and a series of guest analysts, including Marvell Wynne, Sal Zizzo, and Warren Barton. The Spanish radio broadcast on XEPE (1700 AM), a TUDN Radio affiliate, is led by play-by-play announcer Ricardo "Pony" Jiménez.

== Players and staff ==
=== Current roster ===
As of October 7, 2026

Note: Flags indicate national team as defined under FIFA eligibility rules; some limited exceptions apply. Players may hold more than one non-FIFA nationality.

No.	Pos.	Nation	Player
1	GK	CPV	CJ dos Santos
2	DF	GHA	Willy Kumado
3	DF	ISL	Dagur Dan Þórhallsson
5	DF	USA	Kieran Sargeant
6	MF	DEN	Jeppe Tverskov
7	FW	DEN	Marcus Ingvartsen
8	MF	FIN	Onni Valakari
10	FW	DEN	Anders Dreyer
12	MF	BRA	Gabriel Pirani
13	GK	MEX	Pablo Sisniega
14	FW	CIV	Bryan Zamblé
15	MF	USA	Pedro Soma
16	GK	DEN	Marcus Alstrup
17	DF	DEN	Osvald Søe
18	GK	USA	Duran Ferree

No.	Pos.	Nation	Player
19	MF	USA	David Vazquez
20	MF	PAN	Aníbal Godoy
23	DF	USA	Sam Vines (on loan from Houston Dynamo)
24	MF	GHA	Emmanuel Boateng
25	DF	USA	Ian Pilcher
26	DF	GHA	Manu Duah
32	DF	USA	Ian Murphy
33	DF	USA	Oscar Verhoeven
36	MF	CMR	David Mimbang (on loan from Nordsjælland)
70	MF	USA	Alejandro Alvarado Jr.
77	FW	ENG	Alex Mighten
90	FW	NOR	Amahl Pellegrino
94	FW	COD	Cédric Bakambu
97	DF	SWE	Christopher McVey
99	FW	TUN	Elias Achouri

=== Out on loan ===
Note: Flags indicate national team as defined under FIFA eligibility rules; some limited exceptions apply. Players may hold more than one non-FIFA nationality.

No.	Pos.	Nation	Player
11	FW	MEX	Hirving Lozano (on loan to LA Galaxy)
22	DF	USA	Wilson Eisner (on loan to FC Tulsa)

No.	Pos.	Nation	Player
29	FW	TUN	Anisse Saidi (on loan to Benfica)
98	GK	USA	Jacob Jackson (on loan to Monterey Bay FC)

=== Staff ===
Coaching staff
Head coach	Mikey Varas
Assistant coach	Frank Hjortebjerg
Assistant coach	Kelvin Jones
Assistant coach	Luciano Fusco
Goalkeeper coach	Jason Grubb

Last updated: December 2024
Source: San Diego FC

== Honors ==
Domestic
Competitions	Titles	Seasons
Western Conference (Regular Season)	1	2025

== See also ==
- Sports in San Diego
