= List of people from San Jose, California =

This is a list of notable people from San Jose, California. It includes people who were born/raised in, lived in, or spent portions of their lives in San Jose, or for whom San Jose is a significant part of their identity, as well as music groups founded in San Jose. This list is in alphabetical order by surname.

== Actors and entertainment industry ==
- Akhil Akkineni, Indian-American actor who predominantly works in the Telugu film Industry of India
- Elisa Marina Alvarado, Chicana director, actress, educator, recipient of Cornerstone of the Arts award, born in San Jose
- Frank Bacon, actor, playwright and father of Lloyd Bacon, raised in San Jose and lived there for 17 years
- Lloyd Bacon, Hollywood director, son of actor Frank Bacon, born in San Jose
- Adrienne Barbeau, actress, attended Del Mar High School class of 1963
- Calum Best, British television personality, son of footballer George Best, born in San Jose
- Brett Dalton, actor, born in San Jose
- Rosanna DeSoto, actress, born in San Jose
- Dustin Diamond, child actor, known as Screech from Saved By The Bell, born in San Jose
- Ricco Fajardo, voice actor in Danganronpa 3: The End of Hope's Peak High School and various anime, TV actor, born in San Jose
- Phillip Garcia, actor, born in San Jose
- Renée Elise Goldsberry, actress, known for originating the role of Angelica Schuyler in the Broadway musical Hamilton, born in San Jose
- Michael Gough, voice actor, born in San Jose
- Farley Granger, actor, best known for Strangers on a Train, born in San Jose
- Nick Groff, paranormal investigator and television personality, born in San Jose
- Krazy George Henderson, cheerleader, inventor of "The Wave", sports entertainment
- Josh Holloway, actor, Lost, born in San Jose
- Fran Jeffries, singer and actress, born in Palo Alto
- Anjelah Johnson, comedian, born in San Jose
- Jeannie Mai, TV personality, talk show host, fashion expert, makeup artist, born in San Jose
- Peverell Marley, Oscar-nominated, Golden Globe-winning cinematographer, born in San Jose
- Charles Martinet, actor and voice actor, best known for providing the voice of Nintendo's Mario, born in San Jose
- Candi Milo, voice actress, born in San Jose
- Linda Park, actress, originally from Seoul, South Korea and raised in San Jose
- Miguel Perez, actor, born in San Jose
- Ernie Reyes Jr., actor and martial artist, born in San Jose
- Diane Rodriguez, theatre director, actor, writer, born in San Jose
- Gabriela Sepúlveda, singer and actress, Jenni Rivera: Mariposa De Barrio, born in San Jose
- Kurtwood Smith, actor, That '70s Show
- Smothers Brothers, musical comedy duo and actors
- Dave Tatsuno, Japanese-American internment camp resident who made amateur film Topaz, about camp life
- Kathy Uyen, actress and producer for Vietnamese cinema, born in San Jose
- Luis Valdez, playwright and director
- Kung Fu Vampire, musician, also on the Discovery Channel's Oddities, born in San Jose
- Kate Walsh, actress, born in San Jose

== Artists ==
=== Comics and zines ===
- Brent Anderson, comic artist with DC Comics, born in San Jose
- Jan Eliot, comic artist of Stone Soup, born in San Jose
- Julia Kaye, comic artist of Up and Out, illustrator, raised in San Jose
- Francis Ralph Rambo, illustrator, cartoonist, and historian
- Jhonen Vasquez, creator of alternative comics for Slave Labor Graphics and Invader ZIM, born in San Jose

=== Mixed media ===
- Susan O'Malley, public art, museum curation, and author, raised in San Jose

=== Painters ===
- Lucy Bacon, impressionist painter, lived in San Jose 1898–1909, taught at the Washburn Preparatory School
- James Caprell, fine artist, born in San Jose
- Ernest de Saisset, portrait artist
- Chris Johanson, fine artist, part of the Mission School art movement, born in San Jose
- Suzanne Scheuer, painter known for her New Deal-era murals, born in San Jose
- Herman Volz, fine artist, worked with the Federal Art Project, lived in San Jose 1960–1990, died in San Jose

=== Photographers ===
- Bill Owens, photographer and photojournalist documenting suburbia, born in San Jose

=== Sculptors ===
- Ruthadell Anderson, sculptor, fiber artist, textile artist; born in San Jose and attended San Jose State University
- Therese May, fine art quilting, lived in San Jose

== Athletes ==
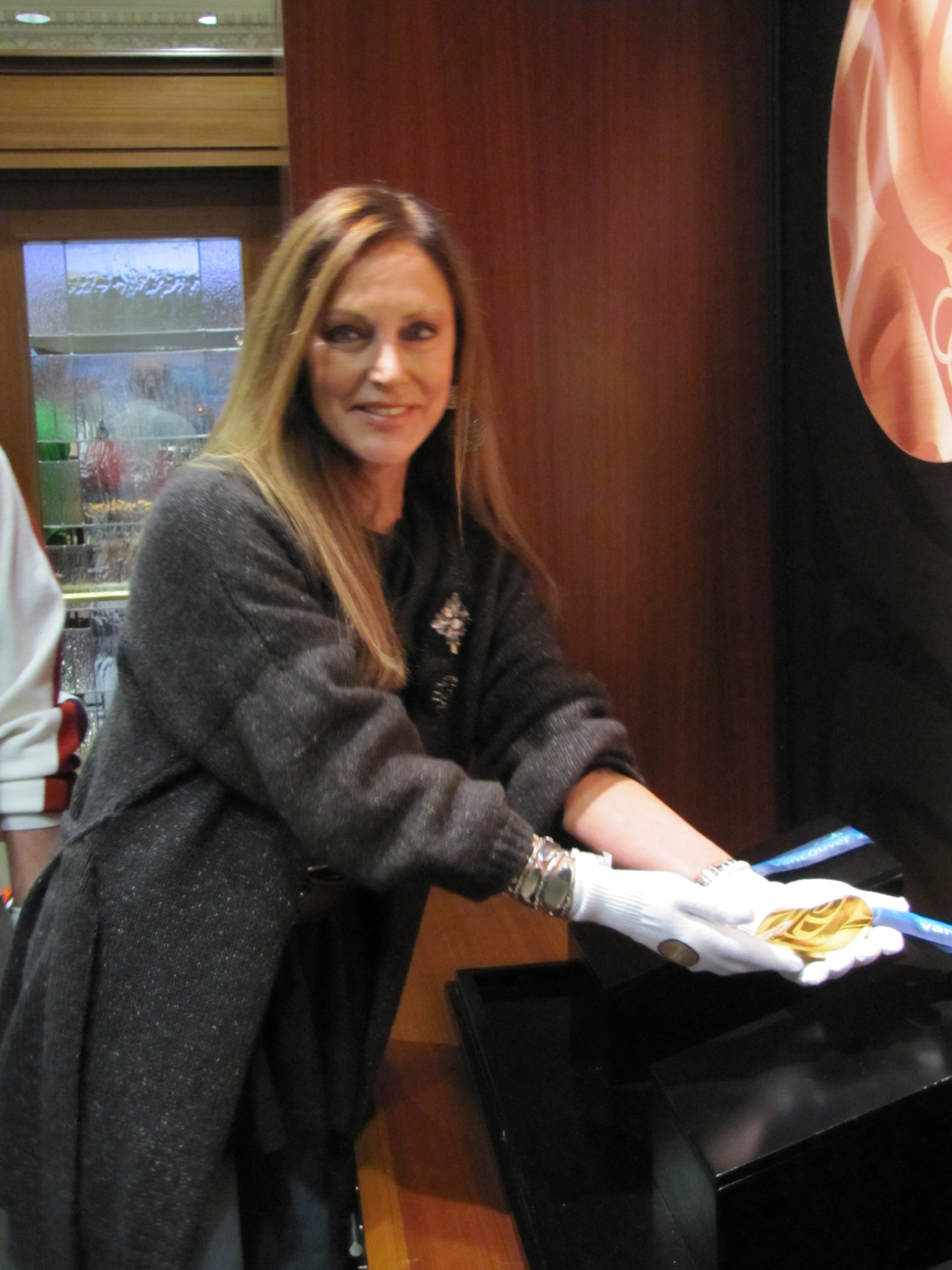
Peggy Fleming

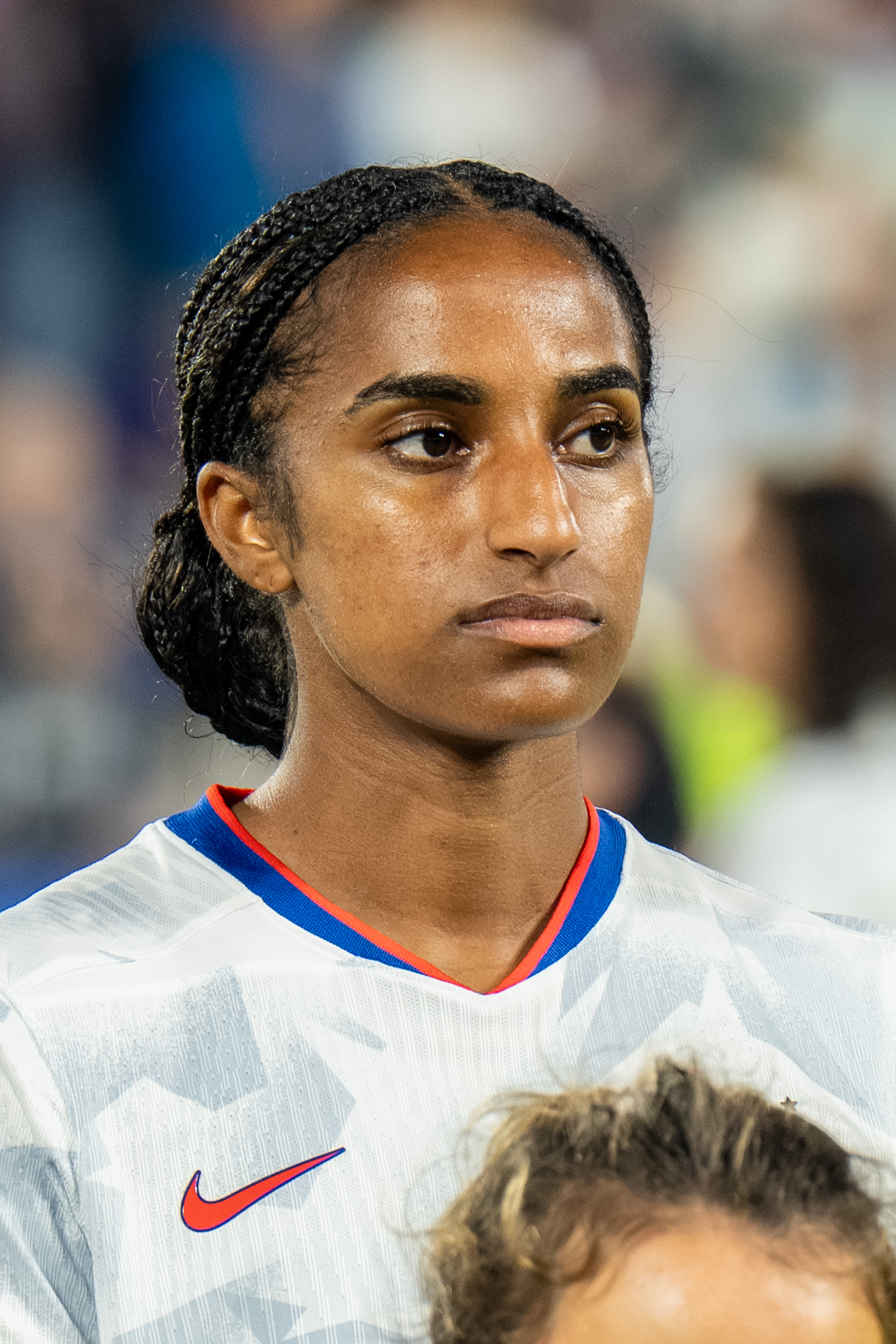
Naomi Girma

- Yorgo Alexandrou, Olympic bobsledder for Armenia (two-man bobsleigh, 2002 Salt Lake City), born and raised in San Jose
- Damián Alguera, soccer player
- Mike Avery, soccer player, coach, and athletic director
- Chidobe Awuzie, NFL player, born in San Jose
- Scott Baker, Major League Baseball player, born in San Jose
- Isaias Bardales Jr., soccer player
- Amir Bashti, soccer player
- Bayley, WWE wrestler
- Steven Beitashour, soccer player
- Isaác Brizuela, soccer player
- Steve Caballero, professional skateboarder, born in San Jose
- Angelo Caloiaro (born 1989), American-Italian basketball player in the Israeli Basketball Premier League
- Ken Caminiti, pro baseball player (San Jose State), 1996 NL MVP
- Rich Campbell, NFL player, played high school football in San Jose
- Mark Canha, baseball player, born in San Jose
- John Carlos, Olympic silver medalist, 200m (1968 Mexico City); track and field athlete; pro football player
- Andre Carter, pro football player
- Brandi Chastain, soccer player, World Cup champion, born in San Jose
- Amy Chow, Olympic gold medalist in gymnastics (1996), born in San Jose
- Kay Cockerill, professional golfer, born in San Jose
- Jerry Coleman, decorated combat pilot, MLB player and manager, Ford Frick Award-winning sportscaster, born in San Jose
- Sam Delaplane (born 1995), professional baseball pitcher
- Adisa De Rosario, soccer player
- Polina Edmunds, Olympic figure skater

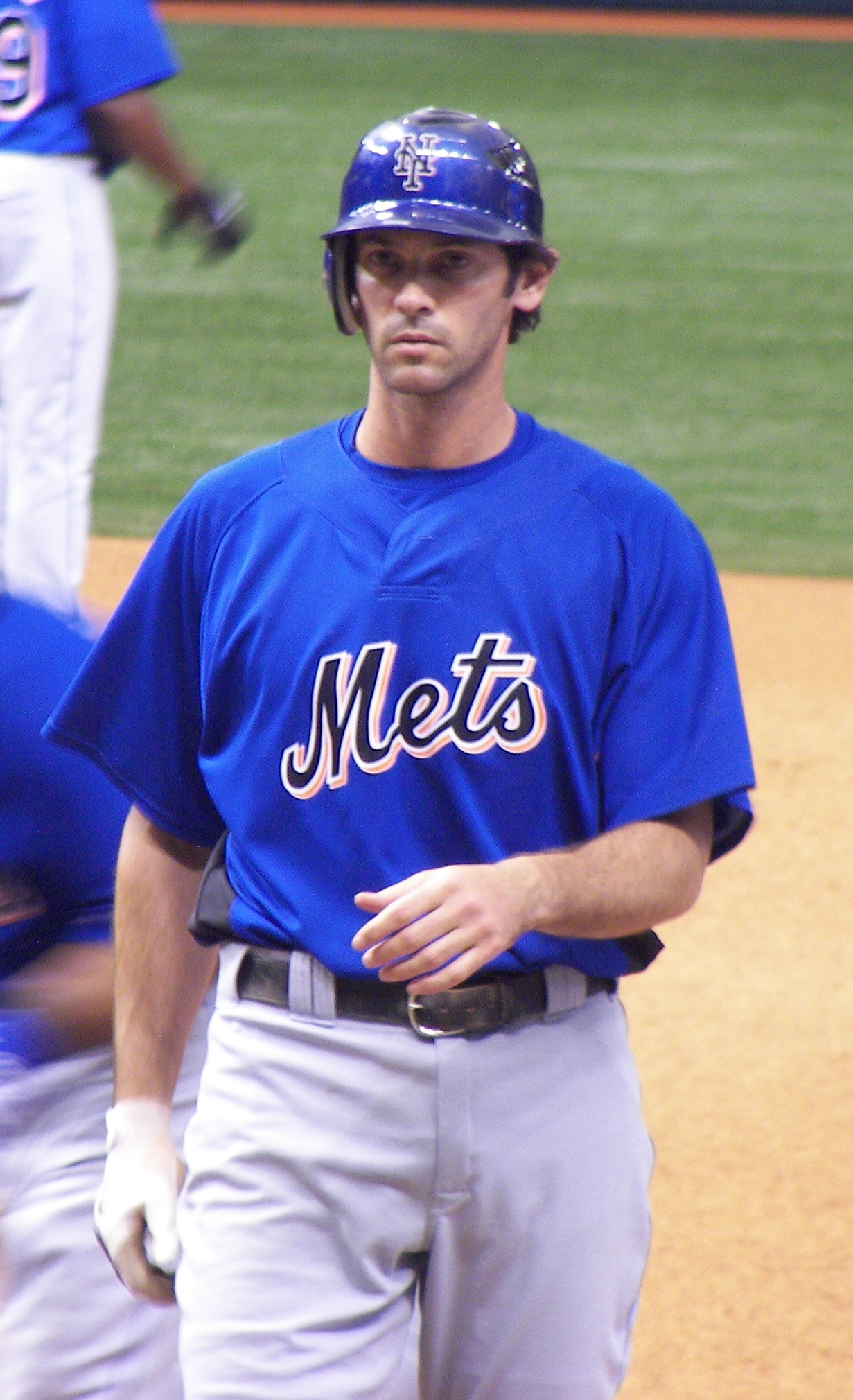
Shawn Green

- Herman Edwards, NFL player, coach, TV commentator
- Jon Fitch, UFC fighter
- Peggy Fleming, 1968 Winter Olympics figure skating gold medalist, born in San Jose
- CJ Fodrey, soccer player
- Rudy Galindo, national champion figure skater, born in San Jose
- Jeff Garcia, pro football quarterback (San Jose State)
- Jeremy Giambi, baseball player, born in San Jose
- Naomi Girma, soccer player for the United States
- Aaron Gordon, player for the Denver Nuggets and brother of Drew Gordon, born in San Jose
- Drew Gordon, player for the Philadelphia 76ers and brother of Aaron Gordon, born in San Jose
- Shawn Green, MLB 2-time All-Star outfielder
- Kyle Harrison (born 2001), baseball pitcher for the San Francisco Giants
- Dany Heatley, pro hockey player, San Jose Sharks

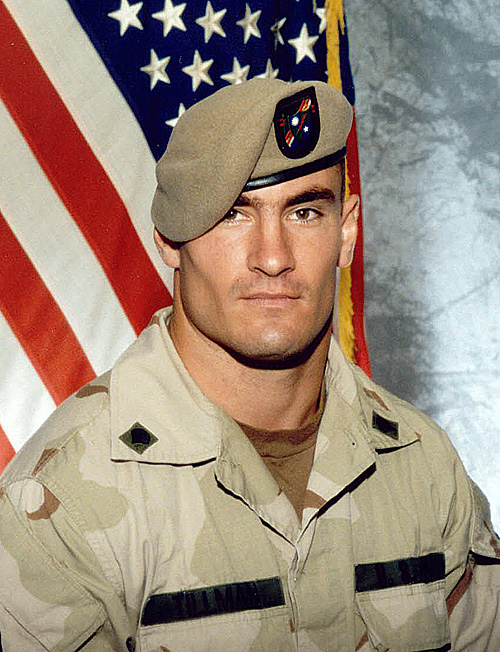
Patrick Tillman

- Mike Holmgren, NFL coach and executive
- Cass Jackson, former college football head coach, one of the first African-American head football coaches at a predominantly white college (Oberlin College)
- John Johnson, NBA basketball, First Team All American at the University of Iowa, lived and died in San Jose
- Brent Jones, football player, Santa Clara University, San Francisco 49ers, three-time Super Bowl champion, born in San Jose
- James Jones, pro football player (San Jose State), Green Bay Packers, Oakland Raiders, born in San Jose
- Carney Lansford, pro baseball player, Oakland A's, 1989 World Series champion, 1981 A.L. batting champion, born in San Jose
- Cung Le, Vietnamese mixed martial arts fighter, three-time Sanshou bronze medalist
- Joe Leonard, automobile and motorcycle champion
- Beau Leroux, soccer player
- Roger Maltbie, professional PGA golfer and NBC Sports On Air golf analyst
- Patrick Marleau, pro hockey player, San Jose Sharks
- Jake McGee, baseball player
- Kyle McLaren, pro hockey player San Jose Sharks
- Tommy Medica, baseball player, born in San Jose
- Marty Mornhinweg, NFL player and coach
- Evgeni Nabokov, pro hockey player, San Jose Sharks
- James Nunnally (born 1990), professional basketball player for Maccabi Tel Aviv of the Israeli Basketball Premier League and the Euroleague, and formerly in the NBA, born in San Jose
- Brian Oldfield, athlete, world and American record holder in shot put
- Jesús Padilla, soccer player for Chivas de Guadalajara, born in San Jose
- Jim Plunkett, quarterback, Stanford University, 1970 Heisman Trophy winner, Oakland Raiders, two-time Super Bowl champion (SB XV MVP), born in San Jose
- John Powell, two-time Olympic bronze medalist (1976 Munich, 1984 L.A.), discus throw
- Dave Righetti, baseball player; 1981 A.L. Rookie of the Year (N.Y. Yankees); pitched no-hitter on July 4, 1983; San Francisco Giants pitching coach, born in San Jose
- Ricco Rodriguez, mixed martial artist, UFC and ADCC champion, born in San Jose
- Frank Shamrock, MMA fighter
- Tommie Smith, Olympic gold medalist - 200m (1968 Mexico City), track and field athlete (San Jose State), pro football player
- Dave Stieb, pro baseball pitcher
- Carl Sullivan, football player, born in San Jose
- Mike Swain, Olympic gold medalist, four-time Olympian, San Jose State judo coach
- Mike Swick, UFC fighter
- Debi Thomas, Olympic figure skater, grew up in San Jose
- Josh Thomson, mixed martial artist and model, born in San Jose
- Joe Thornton, pro hockey player, San Jose Sharks
- Pat Tillman, pro football player and decorated Army Ranger, born in San Jose
- Loren Toews, pro football player
- Yosh Uchida, businessman, educator, contributor to San Jose State judo team, born in San Jose
- Cain Velasquez, MMA fighter
- Dick Vermeil, college and pro football head coach, Super Bowl champion (St. Louis Rams, 1999)
- Aly Wagner, retired soccer player
- Bill Walsh, college and pro football head coach, three-time Super Bowl champion (San Francisco 49ers)

== Business leaders and entrepreneurs ==
- Gurbaksh Chahal, entrepreneur
- Andy Dinh, entrepreneur and professional gamer, born in San Jose
- Amadeo Peter Giannini, founder of Bank of America, born in San Jose
- Peter Ueberroth, sports and business executive, San Jose State University alumnus
- Steve Wozniak, co-founder of Apple Inc., born in San Jose
- Jerry Yang, co-founder of Yahoo!

== Chefs ==
- Angela Dimayuga, internationally known chef born and raised in San Jose

== Dancers ==
- Mythili Kumar, South Indian traditional dancer of Bharatanatyam, resides in San Jose, founder of Abhinaya Dance School of San Jose
- Yuriko Kikuchi (née Amemiya), worked with the Martha Graham Dance Company, born in San Jose

== Designers ==
- Mai Kitazawa Arbegast, landscape architect, born in San Jose
- Kate Bartholomew (1868–1951), created the "Jazz Cap"
- Scott Campbell, video game concept artist for LucasArts then Double Fine Productions, art director, comic artist and illustration, born and raised in San Jose
- Theodore Lenzen, Prussian-born architect, active in San Jose
- Joe Murray, animator, born in San Jose
- Emily Williams, pioneering female architect in the 20th century, attended California State Normal School (later known as SJSU)

== Educators ==
- Peter William Cassey, African-American 19th-century school founder, deacon, minister, educator, abolitionist, and political activist
- Henry Suzzallo, educator; president of the University of Washington

== Musicians and bands ==
- Anohni, frontwoman of Antony and the Johnsons
- Antwon, rapper, lives in San Jose
- Ashe, singer, born in San Jose
- Bassnectar, DJ and electronic music producer
- Louie Bellson, professional drummer
- Tommy Castro, blues, rock
- Charizma, rapper, born in San Jose
- Count Five, garage rock band, formed in San Jose
  - John "Sean" Byrne, musician with Count Five, lived in San Jose
- Irene Dalis, opera singer, founder of Opera San Jose, born in San Jose
- Jimmy DeGrasso, heavy metal drummer
- DJ Shadow, born Joshua Davis, instrumental hip-hop DJ, born in San Jose
- The Doobie Brothers, rock band
  - Tom Johnston, lived in San Jose with the Doobie Brothers
- Duster, indie rock band
- Kawaii Rapper, Bandlab rapper born in San Jose
- Fleetwood Mac, rock band
  - Lindsey Buckingham, musician with Fleetwood Mac
  - Stevie Nicks, singer and musician with Fleetwood Mac
- Jeff Foskett, guitarist and singer, best known for work with The Beach Boys
- Getter, DJ, electronic music producer and rapper
- Heavy Heavy Low Low, metal band formed in San Jose
- The Holdup, reggae and hip hop band formed in San Jose
- Greg Kihn, rock musician and radio DJ
- Kung Fu Vampire, rapper from San Jose
- Los Tigres del Norte, Mexican band formed in San Jose
- Laura Mam, musician and music industry entrepreneur
- Bryan Mantia, drummer for Primus and Guns N' Roses, born in San Jose
- Kamtin Mohager, lead musician for The Chain Gang of 1974
- No Use for a Name, band
  - Matt Riddle, bassist of No Use for a Name, born in San Jose
  - Tony Sly, lead singer and guitarist of No Use for a Name, born in San Jose
- Peanut Butter Wolf, disc jockey and producer from San Jose
- Nikki Sixx, bassist for Mötley Crüe, born in San Jose
- Sleep, doom metal band formed in San Jose
- Smash Mouth, pop-rock band formed in San Jose
- Snow Tha Product, rapper, born in San Jose
- Skip Spence, co-founder of Moby Grape
- Stone Temple Pilots, band
  - Eric Kretz, drummer for Stone Temple Pilots, Talk Show, and Spiralarms, born in San Jose
  - Scott Weiland, vocalist for Stone Temple Pilots, Velvet Revolver, Camp Freddy, The Wondergirls, Art of Anarchy, and The Magnificent Bastards, born in San Jose
- Sunami, hardcore punk band
- Syndicate of Sound, garage rock band formed in San Jose
- Traxamillion, rapper
- Xiu Xiu (band), avant-garde band formed in San Jose
- Yvette Young, singer/songwriter, guitarist/front-woman of Covet
- Kim Yubin, member of South Korean girl group Wonder Girls

== Politicians, civil servants, and activists ==
- Ben Nighthorse Campbell, U.S. senator from Colorado, SJSU graduate
- César Chávez, labor leader and civil rights activist
- C. C. Cottrell, California State Assembly member 1933–1939
- Nathan Damigo, founder of Identity Evropa, an American neo-Nazi and white supremacist organization, grew up in San Jose
- Don Edwards, U.S. representative from California 1963–1995, born in San Jose
- Thomas Fallon, soldier, mayor of San Jose
- Ron Gonzales, mayor of Sunnyvale and San Jose
- Dale Ho (born 1977), U.S. district judge of the U.S. District Court for the Southern District of New York
- Mike Honda, U.S. representative
- Sherman Otis Houghton, mayor of San Jose, U.S. representative
- Sam Liccardo, U.S. representative, former mayor of San Jose and San Jose city councilor
- Zoe Lofgren, U.S. representative
- Norman Mineta, mayor of San Jose, United States Secretary of Transportation, United States Secretary of Commerce, born in San Jose
- Michael A. Rice, biologist and Rhode Island politician, born in San Jose
- Iola Williams, politician and civil rights activist, first African-American to serve on San Jose City Council (1979–1991), vice mayor of San Jose for two terms

== Scientists ==
- Paul André Albert, scientist and pioneering metallurgist with IBM, and founder of ACI Alloys
- Edgar F. Codd, computer scientist
- Dian Fossey, primatologist, SJSU graduate
- Dudley R. Herschbach, winner of the 1986 Nobel Prize in Chemistry, born in San Jose
- Michio Kaku, physicist, born in San Jose

== Writers ==
- Reza Aslan, Iranian-American author, religious studies scholar, producer, and television host; attended Del Mar High School (class of 1990)
- Raymond Carver, short story writer and poet
- Carolyn Cassady, author of the Beat Generation, lived in San Jose
- Neal Cassady, author of the Beat Generation, Merry Pranksters member, inspiration for character Dean Moriarty in Jack Kerouac's novel On The Road, lived in San Jose
- Iris Chang, historian and journalist, lived in San Jose
- Howard Dully, author, My Lobotomy
- Kate Elliott, novelist
- Khaled Hosseini, best-selling novelist, author of The Kite Runner, lived in San Jose
- Wayne Koestenbaum, artist, poet, and cultural critic
- William Lewis Manly, pioneer, hero, banker, and author of Death Valley in '49
- Viet Thanh Nguyen, author of The Sympathizer, winner of the 2016 Pulitzer Prize in Fiction; attended Bellarmine College Preparatory
- James Wesley Rawles, novelist
- Al Ruffo, mayor of San Jose
- Kay Ryan, poet, former Poet Laureate of the United States, born in San Jose
- Amy Tan, best-selling novelist, author of The Joy Luck Club
- Louis Theroux, English documentary filmmaker, journalist and broadcaster
- Jeanne Wakatsuki Houston, author of the memoir Farewell to Manzanar, attended high school and college in San Jose
- Tad Williams, author of the Memory, Sorrow, and Thorn series

== Journalists ==
- Francis B. Murdoch, founder and publisher of the San Jose Weekly Telegraph (1853–1860) and the San Jose Weekly Patriot (1863–1875)
- Vicky Nguyen, NBC News anchor

== Other ==
- Susan Atkins, convicted murderer, Manson Family member
- Joey Chestnut, competitive eater
- Jason Dahl, captain of United Airlines Flight 93 on September 11, 2001, born in San Jose
- Bob Fernandez, veteran, one of the last known survivors of the attack on Pearl Harbor.
- David Marius Guardino, psychic
- Henry Morris Naglee, U.S. Civil War general and served in the Mexican–American War
- Matt Stonie, competitive eater, born in San Jose
- Rick Warren, Baptist evangelical Christian pastor and author
- Sarah Winchester, heiress to the Winchester Rifle Company, occultist, architect to the Winchester Mystery House, lived in San Jose

== See also ==
- List of people from Oakland, California
- List of people from Palo Alto
- List of people from San Francisco, California
- List of people from Santa Cruz, California
