= 2026 Leagues Cup final =

- Pre-match ceremony of the final
- Event: 2026 Leagues Cup
Toluca	Monterrey
(Mexico)	(Mexico)
2	0
- Date: September 6, 2026
- Venue: Shell Energy Stadium, Houston, Texas, United States
- Man of the Match: Helinho (Toluca)
- Referee: Iván Barton (El Salvador)
- Attendance: 21,144

The 2026 Leagues Cup final was the deciding match of the sixth edition of the Leagues Cup, a soccer tournament played between clubs from Major League Soccer (MLS), representing the United States and Canada, and Liga MX, representing Mexico. The match was played on September 6, 2026, at the Shell Energy Stadium in Houston, Texas, United States, between Toluca and Monterrey. Toluca won 2–0 to claim their first Leagues Cup title. The match began with an early goal from Toluca following a Monterrey defensive error, with Monterrey creating several opportunities throughout the first half but unable to convert them. In the second half, Monterrey assumed a more offensive role, but Toluca's compact defensive shape held firm before converting a second goal on the counter to seal the victory.

The result extended Toluca's dominant period under Argentine manager Antonio Mohamed, who added another title to his collection of six trophies won since his appointment in December 2024, including two international titles, making him the most decorated manager in the club's history. The victory also earned Toluca direct qualification to the round of 16 of the 2027 CONCACAF Champions Cup. Toluca midfielder Helinho was named player of the match and forward Alexis Vega the tournament's best player.

== Background ==
The 2026 Leagues Cup was the sixth edition of the Leagues Cup, a soccer tournament contested between clubs from Major League Soccer (MLS), representing the United States and Canada, and Liga MX, representing Mexico. The tournament comprised a group stage followed by a knockout phase in a single-game elimination format. The winner would earn a direct berth to the round of 16 of the 2027 CONCACAF Champions Cup, with the top three finishers also qualifying for the competition, a distinction both Toluca and Monterrey had already secured through other means.

Since the introduction of the torneos cortos (short tournaments) format in 1996, which divided the Liga MX calendar into two seasonal tournaments, Toluca and Monterrey had met 70 times across regular season fixtures and liguilla (playoff) matches, with Toluca holding the advantage at 26 victories to Monterrey's 19, with 25 draws. The two clubs had previously met in the final in the Apertura 2005 season, with Toluca tying 3–3 at home in the first leg before winning 3–0 away to claim the title 6–3 on aggregate. Both clubs were appearing in a Leagues Cup final for the first time, with Toluca having won four of the five previous meetings between the two sides.

=== Road to the final ===
Toluca opened the group stage with a 3–0 victory over Seattle Sounders at Nemesio Diez Stadium on August 5, the first Leagues Cup match ever played in Mexico, as the 2026 edition introduced group stage matches hosted in Mexican venues for the first time. They then lost 1–0 to Los Angeles FC at BMO Stadium to a stoppage time goal before recovering to defeat FC Dallas 3–1 at Nemesio Diez Stadium on August 12, advancing with six points. Monterrey lost their opening match 2–1 to Orlando City at Inter.co Stadium before winning their following two matches, defeating Inter Miami CF 2–1 at Nu Stadium and Nashville SC 2–1 at Geodis Park, also advancing with six points.

In the quarterfinals, Monterrey defeated Chicago Fire FC 2–1 at SeatGeek Stadium on August 25, while Toluca defeated Austin FC 2–0 at Sports Illustrated Stadium on August 26. In the semifinals, Toluca defeated León 2–0 at Shell Energy Stadium on September 2, while Monterrey drew 2–2 with América before winning 5–4 on penalties on September 3. As all four finalists – Toluca, Monterrey, León, and América – were Liga MX clubs, Leagues Cup officials selected Shell Energy Stadium as a neutral venue. Toluca did not concede a single goal throughout the knockout stage.

(Mexico) Toluca
Round
(Mexico) Monterrey
Opponent
Result
League phase
Opponent
Result
(United States) Seattle Sounders FC (H)
3–0
Matchday 1
(United States) Orlando City SC (A)
1–2
(United States) Los Angeles FC (A)
0–1
Matchday 2
(United States) Inter Miami CF (A)
2–1
(United States) FC Dallas (H)
3–1
Matchday 3
(United States) Nashville SC (A)
2–1

3rd in Liga MX table
Pos	Team	Pld	Pts
1	León	3	9
2	América	3	7
3	Toluca	3	6
4	Monterrey	3	6
5	Cruz Azul	3	6

Source: Leagues Cup
Standings

4th in Liga MX table
Pos	Team	Pld	Pts
2	América	3	7
3	Toluca	3	6
4	Monterrey	3	6
5	Cruz Azul	3	6
6	Juárez	3	6

Source: Leagues Cup
Opponent
Result
Knockout stage
Opponent
Result
(United States) Austin FC (A)
2–0
Quarterfinals
(United States) Chicago Fire FC (A)
2–1
(Mexico) León (N)
2–0
Semifinals
(Mexico) América (N)
2–2 (4–5 p)

== Pre-match ==
A week before the final, Toluca's management was negotiating with PFC CSKA Moscow of Russia over an offer for midfielder Helinho, though the transfer did not materialize and Helinho featured in the match. Toluca also confirmed that striker Paulinho had recovered from an injury suffered earlier in the year. Toluca's coach Antonio Mohamed ruled out naming him in the starting lineup, leaving open the possibility of a substitute appearance. Other Toluca players who were injured ahead of the final were goalkeeper Luis García and field players Marcel Ruiz and Érick Gutiérrez. Toluca were also without Bruno Méndez, who was suspended after receiving a second yellow card and subsequent red card in the previous match against León.

Pre-match ceremony displaying the teams' colors

In a pre-match interview, Monterrey manager Matías Almeyda, who had joined the club three months prior, described the achievement of leading Monterrey to a final in a short span as a difficult task and expressed confidence in the team's trajectory. He also acknowledged Toluca as a formidable opponent, particularly highlighting Mohamed's success as a manager.

To avoid scheduling conflicts, Liga MX postponed fixtures of the Apertura 2026 season for both Toluca and Monterrey to accommodate their participation in the Leagues Cup semifinals and final. Toluca's away fixture against Puebla, originally the seventh matchday of the season, was rescheduled to September 15, while Monterrey's home match against Querétaro was moved to November 14. The fixtures involving León and América were also postponed.

On the day of the final, Shell Energy Stadium hosted the third-place match between León and América earlier in the day, with León winning 1–0. Mohamed voiced concern over the double scheduling, citing the potential deterioration of the pitch quality for the final and the challenge of hosting supporters from four different clubs in the same stadium on the same day. The majority of the crowd during the final were Monterrey supporters.

Ahead of the match, Mexican footballer Javier Hernández ("Chicharito") presented the trophy to an ovation from the crowd. The trophy featured a new two-sided design introduced for this edition. American singer-songwriter Gabriela Sepúlveda performed the Mexican national anthem.

== Match ==
=== First half ===
The match began with a foul committed by Toluca defender Federico Pereira, who caught Lucas Ocampos with his forearm while jumping, earning a yellow card just eight seconds into the match. Monterrey created the first clear opportunity on the 2nd minute when Hugo Cuypers attempted a header, only for the ball to go past the left post. In the 4th minute, following a Monterrey defensive error, Federico Viñas's shot struck the post, with Orbelin Pineda's attempted clearance falling to Alexis Vega, who converted the rebound past goalkeeper Esteban Andrada to make it 1–0. Monterrey attempted to respond quickly with an offensive play from Ocampos and Cuypers in the 6th minute, but Toluca goalkeeper Hugo González saved it in front of goal.

Alexis Vega prepares for a free kick in the first half

Toluca controlled possession for several minutes, with Franco Romero's free kick in the 9th minute sailing over Monterrey's goal before a further Toluca effort two minutes later was held by Andrada. Approaching the 13th minute, Pineda was issued a yellow card for a foul from behind on a Toluca player. Monterrey regained possession by the 16th minute, and in the 19th minute a combination between Jesús Corona and Cuypers ended with the ball going wide, with an offside ruling also called. Monterrey continued to press, with Corona delivering a cross into Toluca's penalty area in the 25th minute that found no teammate. Two successive corner kicks in the 28th and 30th minutes were also cleared. In the 31st minute, following a corner kick, Ricardo Chávez directed a header toward goal from Gerardo Arteaga's delivery, only for goalkeeper González to make a one-handed save. In a counter-attack, Toluca created an offensive move led by Helinho, who volleyed the ball twice over Arteaga, only for the play to be paused for a foul.

In the 38th minute, Romero clashed with Pineda to prevent him from reaching Jesús Ricardo Angulo, earning a yellow card. In the 40th minute, Monterrey had another clear opportunity when a Diego Rossi cross intended for Cuypers was deflected by Toluca defender Everardo López in front of goal. López's deflection was close to being an own goal. In the closing minutes of the first half, the tempo between both sides dropped as two minutes of stoppage time were added. Despite creating more opportunities throughout the half, Monterrey were unable to find an equalizer as Toluca maintained their lead. At the whistle, several Toluca players protested to the referee over a foul by Arteaga on Helinho that had gone unacknowledged.

=== Second half ===
No substitute changes were made in the beginning of the second half. Monterrey maintained greater possession and continued to threaten through long passes, crosses, and quick combinations but Toluca's compact defensive shape absorbed the pressure while looking to counter-attack. From the 48th minute, Monterrey delivered several crosses into Toluca's penalty area without creating a clear opportunity. Two minutes later, Viñas collided with a teammate during a free kick, sending the ball over the bar, although offsite was also issued. In the 55th minute, a combination between Viñas and Vega was cut out by Guzmán, who cleared for a corner. Toluca's delivery from the corner was poor, allowing Monterrey to counter through a combination between Corona and Óliver Torres before Toluca conceded a free kick just outside the penalty area. The free kick struck the wall, with Monterrey players protesting to the referee that the defensive line had encroached before the kick was taken.

Monterrey with ball possession during the second half

In the 59th minute, Cuypers came close with a header from a Corona cross that narrowly missed Toluca's goal, with goalkeeper González turning to watch the ball pass wide. Following the chance, González went down claiming an injury, allowing Toluca time to regroup. In the 61st minute, Toluca made two substitutions, replacing Brian García with Diego Barbosa and Angulo with Jorge Díaz Price. Monterrey continued to press Toluca's area, and Mohammed made two more substitutions in the 68th minute, replacing Vega with Víctor Guzmán and Nicolás Castro with Luan Garcia. In the 70th minute, Romero advanced from deep in midfield in a counter-attack and played the ball to Viñas, who drove into the box and shot toward Andrada, whose save fell to Helinho, who scored using left foot to lead the score 2–0. About two minutes later, Toluca came close to a third when Díaz Price broke forward and evaded Andrada with a feint before his shot struck the post.

Monterrey continued to press following Toluca's second goal. They made two substitutions on the 75th minute, replacing Ricardo Chávez with Uroš Đurđević and Torres with Luca Orellano. Shortly after the substitutions, Barbosa was issued a yellow card for a foul close to the penalty area. In the 78th minute, Toluca introduced Paulinho as a substitute for Helinho, with Paulinho making his return after more than 100 days out through injury. Shortly after, González went down with a muscular complaint and was attended to for two minutes before resuming play. In the 82nd minute, a corner kick from Corona was met by Ocampos with a header that went wide. Monterrey was granted a free kick opportunity five minutes later which Orellano sent wide. Monterrey made two more substitutions after the free kick, replacing Pineda with Íker Fimbres and Corona with Fidel Ambriz. Close to the 90th minute, Cuypers bumped García with his elbow and was issued a yellow card. Six minutes of stoppage time were added, but Toluca held on to seal the victory.

=== Details ===
September 6, 2026
9:15 p.m. (8:15 p.m. UTC−5)

Toluca (Mexico)	2–0	(Mexico) Monterrey
Vega 4'; Helinho 70'

Shell Energy Stadium, Houston
Attendance: 21,144
Referee: Iván Barton (El Salvador)

Toluca	Monterrey

GK	1	(Mexico) Hugo González
RB	17	(Mexico) Brian García	(substituted off) 61'
CB	6	(Uruguay) Federico Pereira	(yellow card) 1'
CB	25	(Mexico) Everardo López
LB	20	(Mexico) Jesús Gallardo
RM	5	(Argentina) Franco Romero	(yellow card) 39'
CM	10	(Mexico) Jesús Angulo	(substituted off) 61'
LM	8	(Argentina) Nicolás Castro	(substituted off) 68'
CF	11	(Brazil) Helinho	(substituted off) 78'
CF	16	(Uruguay) Federico Viñas
CF	9	(Mexico) Alexis Vega (c)	(substituted off) 68'
Substitutes:
CM	26	(Mexico) Jorge Díaz Price	(substituted on) 61'
CF	23	(Mexico) Oswaldo Virgen
GK	18	(Mexico) David Shrem
CM	192	(Mexico) Luis Navarrete
MF	15	(Mexico) Pável Pérez
GK	12	(Mexico) Rolando Beltrán
RB	2	(Mexico) Diego Barbosa	(yellow card) 75' (substituted on) 61'
MF	7	(Mexico) Víctor Guzmán	(substituted on) 68'
MF	24	(United States) Fernando Arce Jr.
CF	26	(Portugal) Paulinho	(substituted on) 78'
CB	3	(Mexico) Antonio Briseño
CB	13	(Brazil) Luan Garcia	(substituted on) 68'
Manager:
(Argentina) Antonio Mohamed

GK	1	(Argentina) Esteban Andrada
RB	2	(Mexico) Ricardo Chávez	(substituted off) 75'
CB	4	(Mexico) Víctor Guzmán
CB	13	(Mexico) Carlos Salcedo
LB	3	(Mexico) Gerardo Arteaga
CM	8	(Spain) Óliver Torres	(substituted off) 75'
CM	25	(Mexico) Orbelín Pineda	(yellow card) 13' (substituted off) 88'
RW	7	(Argentina) Lucas Ocampos
CF	9	(Uruguay) Diego Rossi
LW	9	(Mexico) Jesús Corona (c)	(substituted off) 88'
CF	99	(Belgium) Hugo Cuypers	(yellow card) 90'
Substitutes:
CM	18	(Mexico) César Garza
CM	11	(Mexico) Iker Fimbres	(substituted on) 88'
CM	5	(Mexico) Fidel Ambríz	(substituted on) 88'
RW	10	(Argentina) Luca Orellano	(substituted on) 75'
GK	31	(Mexico) César Ramos
CF	27	(Mexico) Roberto de la Rosa
LB	21	(Mexico) Luis Reyes
CB	30	(Argentina) Jorge Rodríguez
CB	14	(Mexico) Érick Aguirre
GK	22	(Mexico) Luis Cárdenas
RB	33	(Colombia) Stefan Medina
CF	32	(Montenegro) Uroš Đurđević	(substituted on) 75'
Manager:
(Argentina) Matías Almeyda

Assistant referees:
David Morán (El Salvador)
Henri Pupiro (El Salvador)
Keylor Herrera (Costa Rica)
Guillermo Pacheco (Mexico)

Overall statistics
Statistic	Toluca	Monterrey
Goals scored	2	0
Total shots	9	14
Shots on target	5	2
Saves	1	4
Corner kicks	2	15
Crosses	1	14
Fouls	21	13
Offsides	0	3
Clearances	23	4
Yellow cards	3	2
Red cards	0	0
Possession	51.9%	48.1%
Passing accuracy	81.3%	80.9%

== Post-match ==
Toluca's victory marked the first time a Liga MX club won the Leagues Cup in its expanded format, introduced in 2023 when the competition was officially sanctioned by CONCACAF and recognized as an official competition. The last time a Mexican team claimed the title was in 2021 when León won the 2021 Leagues Cup. In the trophy presentation, Hernández handed the trophy to Vega, who lifted it alongside the rest of the Toluca squad. Helinho was named player of the match and Vega received the tournament's best player award. Toluca received US$2 million for winning the tournament, while Monterrey received US$1 million as runners-up.

Toluca players standing in line before receiving the trophy

The victory was Mohamed's second international title since joining Toluca in December 2024, cementing his status as the most decorated manager in the club's history, surpassing former Toluca coach Nacho Trelles. Since his appointment, Mohamed won six trophies with the Toluca, including the back-to-back Liga MX Clausura 2025 and Apertura 2025 seasons, the 2025 Campeón de Campeones super cup, the 2025 Campeones Cup, and the 2026 CONCACAF Champions Cup, his most recent title prior to the Leagues Cup. The run represents one of the most successful in the history of Mexican football, with Toluca having won every major title available to them within a year and a half.

Following the match, Mohamed held a press conference in which he confirmed he would remain with Toluca, dismissing rumors of a move River Plate of Argentina. He expressed enthusiasm for the club's upcoming participation in the 2026 FIFA Intercontinental Cup. Mohamed also spoke about Monterrey, noting that he had been reluctant to face them given his affinity for the club. Mohamed played for Monterrey and later managed them on two occasions, winning a title in his second stint. Almeyda also addressed the press, stating that he had spoken with his squad about the defeat and asked them to refocus ahead of their next Liga MX fixture, Monterrey's Clásico Regiomontano derby against Tigres UANL. In a post-match press conference, Vega noted that the team remained focused on winning that season's Liga MX title, with their next league fixture against Atlas.

The yellow card issued to Pereira eight seconds into the match was the fastest in CONCACAF competition history and among the fastest ever recorded in professional football. In addition, the goal scored by Vega on the 4th minute was the fastest goal in the history of the Leagues Cup.

== Entertainment ==
The final featured a halftime show, the first in the tournament's history. American regional Mexican music trio Yahritza y su Esencia performed during the interval, drawing boos from a portion of the crowd. The group had previously been the subject of controversy following a 2023 visit to Mexico, during which their comments about Mexican cuisine and noise pollution in Mexico City drew criticism on social media.
