= Daniel Arcila =

Colombian footballer (born 2002)

Personal information
- Full name: Daniel Felipe Arcila Rojas
- Date of birth: 16 May 2002 (age 24)
- Place of birth: Mariquita, Colombia
- Height: 1.76 m (5 ft 9 in)
- Position: Midfielder

Team information
- Current team: León
- Number: 13

Youth career
- 2013–2022: Envigado

Senior career*
Years	Team	Apps	(Gls)
2022–2025	Envigado	85	(7)
2025–	León	30	(8)

International career^{‡}
- Colombia U23
2026–	Colombia	1	(1)
- * Club domestic league appearances and goals as of 21 September 2026 ‡ National team caps and goals as of 6 October 2026

Daniel Felipe Arcila Rojas (born 16 May 2002) is a Colombian professional footballer who plays as a midfielder for Liga MX club León and the Colombia national team.

== Early life and youth career ==
Arcila was born on 16 May 2002 in Mariquita, Tolima, Colombia. He grew up playing microfútbol in his hometown. Arcila was discovered at a scouting event in Honda by Wilson James Rodríguez, father of James Rodríguez, who encouraged him to try out for the Envigado academy in 2013. He progressed through the Envigado youth teams and was coached by Andrés Orozco, whom he credits for his development during the time.

Arcila helped the Envigado U20 side win the Supercopa Juvenil FCF in 2022, scoring the lone goal in the first leg of their 3–0 aggregate win over Cúcuta Deportivo in the final. However, he was not able to join the team at the 2023 U-20 Copa Libertadores because he was born before the cutoff date.

== Club career ==
Arcila made his professional debut with the Envigado first team in the Liga DIMAYOR on 13 May 2022, coming on as a second-half substitute for William Hurtado in a 1–1 draw against Deportes Tolima at the Estadio Manuel Murillo Toro. After becoming a regular starter in 2023, he scored his first professional goal on 10 November 2024, netting in a 1–0 win over Deportivo Cali. Arcila recorded 11 goals and five assists in 97 official appearances (league and cup) with Envigado from 2022 to 2025, including four goals in the 2025 Copa Colombia. In his final match with the club on 24 July 2025, he recorded a hat-trick in a 4–3 league victory over Independiente Medellín.

On 4 August 2025, Arcila was officially signed by Liga MX club León. This was announced via a boxing-themed hype video in which he appeared alongside club legends Marco Antonio "Chato" Ferreira and Martín Peña. Arcila made his club debut on 11 August, coming on as a halftime substitute and scoring in the 65th minute of a 3–1 defeat to Monterrey, and made seven total appearances in the Apertura 2025 season. Arcila then played 14 matches for León in the Clausura 2026 season, netting three goals.

In August 2026, Arcila netted seven goals in a six-match scoring streak, which received substantial media coverage, especially in Colombia. On 1 August, he scored in a 1–0 league win over Pachuca. During the Leagues Cup league phase, he scored the game-winner in the 79th minute of a 1–0 victory over Nashville on 5 August, and then scored the second goal in a 2–1 comeback win over Orlando City three days later. On 12 August, Arcila recorded a brace in a 3–2 victory over a Lionel Messi-led Inter Miami, including the game-winner in the 83rd minute, to secure León's spot in the knockout stage and eliminate Inter Miami from the competition. He concluded his streak with goals in consecutive Liga MX victories over Necaxa and Monterrey on 17 and 21 August, respectively.

== International career ==
On 7 October 2026, Arcila made his debut for the Colombia national team in a friendly against Peru, scoring Colombia's second goal in a 2–0 victory.

== Career statistics ==
=== International statistics ===
As of match played 6 October 2026

Appearances and goals by national team and year
National team	Year	Apps	Goals
Colombia	2026	1	1
Total		1	1

Scores and results list Colombia's goal tally first, score column indicates score after each Arcila goal.

List of international goals scored by Daniel Arcila
No.	Date	Venue	Opponent	Score	Result	Competition	Ref.
1	6 October 2026	Hard Rock Stadium, Miami, United States	Peru	2–0	2–0	Friendly	

== Player profile ==
Arcila is an attacking midfielder and is left-footed.

== Honours ==
Envigado

- Supercopa Juvenil FCF: 2022

Individual

- Leagues Cup top scorer: 2026 (shared)
