= 2026 Leagues Cup league phase =

Soccer tournament results

The 2026 Leagues Cup league phase began on August 4 and ended on August 13. A total of 36 teams competed in the league phase to decide the 8 places in the knockout stage of the 2026 Leagues Cup. The league phase schedule was announced on March 5. This edition of the tournament had four matches played in Mexico unlike previous editions, where all matches were played in the United States and Canada.

== League phase table ==
=== Liga MX ===
Pos	Team	Pld	W	PW	PL	L	GF	GA	GD	Pts	Qualification
1	León	3	3	0	0	0	6	3	+3	9	Advance to knockout stage
2	América	3	2	0	1	0	7	3	+4	7	Advance to knockout stage
3	Toluca	3	2	0	0	1	6	2	+4	6	Advance to knockout stage
4	Monterrey	3	2	0	0	1	5	4	+1	6	Advance to knockout stage
5	Cruz Azul	3	2	0	0	1	4	3	+1	6	
6	Juárez	3	2	0	0	1	5	5	0	6	
7	Tigres UANL	3	0	3	0	0	2	2	0	6	
8	Guadalajara	3	1	0	1	1	3	3	0	4	
9	Pachuca	3	1	0	0	2	3	5	−2	3	
10	Santos Laguna	3	1	0	0	2	3	5	−2	3	
11	Atlas	3	1	0	0	2	3	6	−3	3	
12	Necaxa	3	1	0	0	2	3	6	−3	3	
13	Atlante	3	1	0	0	2	2	7	−5	3	
14	Atlético San Luis	3	0	0	1	2	5	10	−5	1	
15	Querétaro	3	0	0	1	2	1	6	−5	1	
16	Pumas UNAM	3	0	0	1	2	1	6	−5	1	
17	Tijuana	3	0	0	0	3	1	6	−5	0	
18	Puebla	3	0	0	0	3	4	11	−7	0	

Source: Leagues Cup

=== Major League Soccer ===
Pos	Team	Pld	W	PW	PL	L	GF	GA	GD	Pts	Qualification
1	Chicago Fire FC	3	3	0	0	0	7	2	+5	9	Advance to knockout stage
2	Austin FC	3	2	1	0	0	6	1	+5	8	Advance to knockout stage
3	Columbus Crew	3	2	1	0	0	6	3	+3	8	Advance to knockout stage
4	Real Salt Lake	3	2	0	1	0	8	1	+7	7	Advance to knockout stage
5	Los Angeles FC	3	1	2	0	0	3	2	+1	7	
6	Charlotte FC	3	2	0	0	1	5	1	+4	6	
7	Portland Timbers	3	2	0	0	1	9	6	+3	6	
8	FC Cincinnati	3	2	0	0	1	6	3	+3	6	
9	FC Dallas	3	2	0	0	1	4	3	+1	6	
10	San Diego FC	3	2	0	0	1	5	5	0	6	
11	Orlando City SC	3	1	1	0	1	5	5	0	5	
12	Minnesota United FC	3	1	0	1	1	4	3	+1	4	
13	Nashville SC	3	1	0	0	2	5	4	+1	3	
14	Inter Miami CF	3	1	0	0	2	7	7	0	3	
15	New York City FC	3	1	0	0	2	4	4	0	3	
16	Seattle Sounders FC	3	1	0	0	2	4	5	−1	3	
17	Philadelphia Union	3	1	0	0	2	3	4	−1	3	
18	Vancouver Whitecaps FC	3	0	0	1	2	2	5	−3	1	

Source: Leagues Cup

== Results summary ==
The matches were played on August 4–6, August 7–9, and August 11–13, 2026.

Times are EDT (UTC−4), as listed by CONCACAF (local times, if different, are in parentheses).

Matchday 1
Team 1	Score	Team 2
Columbus Crew (United States)	3–1	(Mexico) Atlas
FC Cincinnati (United States)	3–1	(Mexico) Pachuca
Charlotte FC (United States)	3–0	(Mexico) Pumas UNAM
Minnesota United FC (United States)	1–2	(Mexico) Juárez
Tigres UANL (Mexico)	1–1 (6–5 p)	(United States) Real Salt Lake
Vancouver Whitecaps FC (Canada)	0–1	(Mexico) Atlante
Inter Miami CF (United States)	4–2	(Mexico) Atlético San Luis
Monterrey (Mexico)	1–2	(United States) Orlando City SC
Nashville SC (United States)	0–1	(Mexico) León
FC Dallas (United States)	2–0	(Mexico) Querétaro
Los Angeles FC (United States)	1–1 (5–4 p)	(Mexico) Guadalajara
Toluca (Mexico)	3–0	(United States) Seattle Sounders FC
New York City FC (United States)	2–0	(Mexico) Santos Laguna
Cruz Azul (Mexico)	1–0	(United States) Philadelphia Union
Chicago Fire FC (United States)	2–0	(Mexico) Necaxa
Austin FC (United States)	2–0	(Mexico) Tijuana
Portland Timbers (United States)	5–2	(Mexico) Puebla
América (Mexico)	3–1	(United States) San Diego FC

Matchday 2
Team 1	Score	Team 2
Charlotte FC (United States)	2–0	(Mexico) Atlas
Columbus Crew (United States)	2–1	(Mexico) Pachuca
FC Cincinnati (United States)	2–0	(Mexico) Pumas UNAM
Tigres UANL (Mexico)	0–0 (4–2 p)	(United States) Minnesota United FC
Vancouver Whitecaps FC (Canada)	1–3	(Mexico) Juárez
Orlando City SC (United States)	1–2	(Mexico) León
Inter Miami CF (United States)	1–2	(Mexico) Monterrey
Guadalajara (Mexico)	0–1	(United States) FC Dallas
Real Salt Lake (United States)	4–0	(Mexico) Atlante
Toluca (Mexico)	0–1	(United States) Los Angeles FC
Seattle Sounders FC (United States)	3–0	(Mexico) Querétaro
Cruz Azul (Mexico)	2–1	(United States) New York City FC
Philadelphia Union (United States)	3–1	(Mexico) Necaxa
Chicago Fire FC (United States)	3–1	(Mexico) Santos Laguna
Nashville SC (United States)	4–1	(Mexico) Atlético San Luis
Austin FC (United States)	3–0	(Mexico) Puebla
América (Mexico)	3–1	(United States) Portland Timbers
San Diego FC (United States)	1–0	(Mexico) Tijuana

Matchday 3
Team 1	Score	Team 2
Columbus Crew (United States)	1–1 (3–2 p)	(Mexico) Pumas UNAM
Charlotte FC (United States)	0–1	(Mexico) Pachuca
FC Cincinnati (United States)	1–2	(Mexico) Atlas
Minnesota United FC (United States)	3–1	(Mexico) Atlante
Real Salt Lake (United States)	3–0	(Mexico) Juárez
Tigres UANL (Mexico)	1–1 (5–4 p)	(Canada) Vancouver Whitecaps FC
Orlando City SC (United States)	2–2 (5–3 p)	(Mexico) Atlético San Luis
Inter Miami CF (United States)	2–3	(Mexico) León
Monterrey (Mexico)	2–1	(United States) Nashville SC
Toluca (Mexico)	3–1	(United States) FC Dallas
Los Angeles FC (United States)	1–1 (5–3 p)	(Mexico) Querétaro
San Diego FC (United States)	3–2	(Mexico) Puebla
Seattle Sounders FC (United States)	1–2	(Mexico) Guadalajara
Philadelphia Union (United States)	0–2	(Mexico) Santos Laguna
New York City FC (United States)	1–2	(Mexico) Necaxa
Cruz Azul (Mexico)	1–2	(United States) Chicago Fire FC
América (Mexico)	1–1 (5–6 p)	(United States) Austin FC
Portland Timbers (United States)	3–1	(Mexico) Tijuana

=== Matchday 1 ===
August 4, 2026
19:30

FC Cincinnati (United States)	3–1	(Mexico) Pachuca
Evander 18'; Bucha 39'; Dem 70'	Report	Alcaraz 7'

TQL Stadium, Cincinnati
Attendance: 23,687
Referee: Oshane Nation (Jamaica)

August 4, 2026
19:45

Columbus Crew (United States)	3–1	(Mexico) Atlas
Ruvalcaba 28'; Zawadzki 45+2'; Méndez 51'	Report	Zawadzki 67' (o.g.)

ScottsMiracle-Gro Field, Columbus
Attendance: 9,528
Referee: Marco Ortíz (Mexico)

August 4, 2026
20:00

Charlotte FC (United States)	3–0	(Mexico) Pumas UNAM
Bronico 27'; Goodwin 50'; Smalls 78' (pen.)	Report

Bank of America Stadium, Charlotte
Attendance: 22,530
Referee: Rubiel Vazquez (United States)

August 4, 2026
20:30 (19:30 UTC−5)

Minnesota United FC (United States)	1–2	(Mexico) Juárez
Chancalay 34'	Report	Castilho 22'; Estupiñán 38'

Allianz Field, Saint Paul
Attendance: 16,022
Referee: Alyssa Pennington (United States)

August 4, 2026
22:00 (20:00 UTC−6)

Tigres UANL (Mexico)	1–1	(United States) Real Salt Lake
Brunetta 6'	Report	Ruiz 16'
Penalties
Brunetta (penalty scored); Gorriarán (penalty scored); Aguirre (penalty scored); Araújo (penalty scored); Franco (penalty scored); Garza (penalty scored)	6–5	(penalty scored) Sanabria; (penalty scored) Solans; (penalty scored) Luna; (penalty scored) Caliskan; (penalty scored) Engel; (penalty missed) Booth

America First Field, Sandy
Attendance: 16,155
Referee: Selvin Brown (Honduras)

August 4, 2026
22:30 (19:30 UTC−7)

Vancouver Whitecaps FC (Canada)	0–1	(Mexico) Atlante
	Report	Julio 40'

BC Place, Vancouver
Attendance: 19,824
Referee: Katja Koroleva (United States)

August 5, 2026
19:30

Inter Miami CF (United States)	4–2	(Mexico) Atlético San Luis
Messi 11', 44'; Segovia 26'; Micael 45+7'	Report	Rodríguez 4'; Llorente 51'

Nu Stadium, Miami
Attendance: 23,999
Referee: Saíd Martínez (Honduras)

August 5, 2026
19:30

Monterrey (Mexico)	1–2	(United States) Orlando City SC
Cuypers 90+9'	Report	Griezmann 27'; Spicer 60' (pen.)

Inter.co Stadium, Orlando
Attendance: 16,603
Referee: Adonai Escobedo (Mexico)

August 5, 2026
20:30 (19:30 UTC−5)

Nashville SC (United States)	0–1	(Mexico) León
	Report	Arcila 79'

Geodis Park, Nashville
Attendance: 18,436
Referee: Sergio Reyna (Guatemala)

August 5, 2026
20:30 (19:30 UTC−5)

FC Dallas (United States)	2–0	(Mexico) Querétaro
Moreno 47'; Valiente 81'	Report

Texas Health Mansfield Stadium, Mansfield
Attendance: 4,335
Referee: Daniel Quintero (Mexico)

August 5, 2026
22:00 (20:00 UTC−6)

Toluca (Mexico)	3–0	(United States) Seattle Sounders FC
Gallardo 3'; Helinho 64'; Viñas 90+3'	Report

Estadio Nemesio Díez, Toluca
Attendance: 23,467
Referee: Iván Barton (El Salvador)

August 5, 2026
22:30 (19:30 UTC−7)

Los Angeles FC (United States)	1–1	(Mexico) Guadalajara
Bouanga 38'	Report	Alvarado 42'
Penalties
Bouanga (penalty scored); Boyd (penalty scored); Delgado (penalty missed); Choinière (penalty scored); Porteous (penalty scored); Terry (penalty scored)	5–4	(penalty missed) Castañeda; (penalty scored) Marín; (penalty scored) Alvarado; (penalty scored) Gutiérrez; (penalty scored) Rey; (penalty missed) Romo

BMO Stadium, Los Angeles
Attendance: 22,132
Referee: César Ramos (Mexico)

August 6, 2026
19:30

New York City FC (United States)	2–0	(Mexico) Santos Laguna
Gray 50'; Cavallo 66'	Report

Sports Illustrated Stadium, Harrison
Attendance: 12,275
Referee: Andrew Samuel (Trinidad and Tobago)

August 6, 2026
20:00

Cruz Azul (Mexico)	1–0	(United States) Philadelphia Union
Paradela 3'	Report

Subaru Park, Chester
Attendance: 14,958
Referee: Juan Gabriel Calderón (Costa Rica)

August 6, 2026
20:30 (19:30 UTC−5)

Chicago Fire FC (United States)	2–0	(Mexico) Necaxa
Dean 31'; Gutman 69'	Report

SeatGeek Stadium, Bridgeview
Attendance: 9,005
Referee: Rosendo Mendoza (United States)

August 6, 2026
21:00 (20:00 UTC−5)

Austin FC (United States)	2–0	(Mexico) Tijuana
Rosales 16'; Gallagher 45+2'	Report

Q2 Stadium, Austin
Attendance: 20,738
Referee: Reon Radix (Grenada)

August 6, 2026
22:00 (20:00 UTC−6)

América (Mexico)	3–1	(United States) San Diego FC
Rodríguez 11'; Sánchez 33'; Violante 45+3'	Report	Bombino 63'

Estadio Azteca, Mexico City
Attendance: 39,993
Referee: Mario Escobar (Guatemala)

August 6, 2026
22:30 (19:30 UTC−7)

Portland Timbers (United States)	5–2	(Mexico) Puebla
Lassiter 5', 56'; Bassett 36', 45+3'; Da Costa 38'	Report	Mustre 14'; Gómez 80'

Providence Park, Portland
Attendance: 11,330
Referee: Victor Rivas (United States)

=== Matchday 2 ===
August 7, 2026
19:30

Charlotte FC (United States)	2–0	(Mexico) Atlas
Abada 78'; Smalls 90+5'	Report

Bank of America Stadium, Charlotte
Attendance: 15,579
Referee: Julio Luna (Guatemala)

August 7, 2026
19:30

Columbus Crew (United States)	2–1	(Mexico) Pachuca
Méndez 19'; Gazdag 45+2'	Report	Idrissi 72'

ScottsMiracle-Gro Field, Columbus
Attendance: 19,443
Referee: Filip Dujic (Canada)

August 7, 2026
20:00

FC Cincinnati (United States)	2–0	(Mexico) Pumas UNAM
Bucha 45+1'; Dem 90+3'	Report

TQL Stadium, Cincinnati
Attendance: 20,767
Referee: Oliver Vergara (Panama)

August 7, 2026
21:00 (20:00 UTC−5)

Tigres UANL (Mexico)	0–0	(United States) Minnesota United FC
	Report
Penalties
Brunetta (penalty scored); Gorriarán (penalty scored); Araújo (penalty missed); Herrera (penalty scored); Lainez (penalty scored)	4–2	(penalty missed) Yeboah; (penalty missed) Pereyra; (penalty scored) Harvey; (penalty scored) Trapp

Allianz Field, Saint Paul
Attendance: 16,705
Referee: José Carlos Rivero (United States)

August 7, 2026
22:30 (19:30 UTC−7)

Vancouver Whitecaps FC (Canada)	1–3	(Mexico) Juárez
Badwal 12'	Report	Ayón 34'; Estupiñán 74'; Ricardinho 90+6'

BC Place, Vancouver
Attendance: 13,328
Referee: Karen Hernández (Mexico)

August 8, 2026
18:30

Orlando City SC (United States)	1–2	(Mexico) León
Pašalić 38'	Report	Guevara 54'; Arcila 72'

Inter.co Stadium, Orlando
Attendance: 12,021
Referee: Jose Espinoza (Honduras)

August 8, 2026
20:00

Inter Miami CF (United States)	1–2	(Mexico) Monterrey
De Paul 32'	Report	Cuypers 47'; Rossi 90'

Nu Stadium, Miami
Attendance: 26,543
Referee: Bryan López (Guatemala)

August 8, 2026
21:00 (18:00 UTC−7)

Guadalajara (Mexico)	0–1	(United States) FC Dallas
	Report	Farrington 73'

PayPal Park, San Jose
Referee: Josué Ugalde (Costa Rica)

August 8, 2026
22:00 (20:00 UTC−6)

Real Salt Lake (United States)	4–0	(Mexico) Atlante
Solans 17'; Booth 50'; Engel 54'; Ruiz 90'	Report

America First Field, Sandy
Attendance: 19,510
Referee: Lizzet García (Mexico)

August 8, 2026
23:10 (20:10 UTC−7)

Toluca (Mexico)	0–1	(United States) Los Angeles FC
	Report	Segura 90+1'

BMO Stadium, Los Angeles
Attendance: 22,111
Referee: Víctor Cáceres (Mexico)

August 9, 2026
17:00 (14:00 UTC−7)

Seattle Sounders FC (United States)	3–0	(Mexico) Querétaro
Gomez 4'; Musovski 41'; Rusnák 68'	Report

Lumen Field, Seattle
Attendance: 28,306
Referee: Luis Enrique Santander (Mexico)

August 9, 2026
19:30

Philadelphia Union (United States)	3–1	(Mexico) Necaxa
Harriel 3'; Damiani 12'; C. Sullivan 53'	Report	Espindola 79'

Subaru Park, Chester
Attendance: 6,504
Referee: Jefferson Escobar (Honduras)

August 9, 2026
19:30

Cruz Azul (Mexico)	2–1	(United States) New York City FC
Palavecino 35'; Paradela 78'	Report	Murray 45+1'

Sports Illustrated Stadium, Harrison
Attendance: 20,969
Referee: Jesús López (Mexico)

August 9, 2026
20:00 (19:00 UTC−5)

Chicago Fire FC (United States)	3–1	(Mexico) Santos Laguna
Zinckernagel 72'; Lod 90'; Lewandowski 90+3'	Report	Bullaude 20'

SeatGeek Stadium, Bridgeview
Attendance: 14,341
Referee: Reginald Gumbs (Saint Kitts and Nevis)

August 9, 2026
20:00 (19:00 UTC−5)

Nashville SC (United States)	4–1	(Mexico) Atlético San Luis
Espinoza 36', 45+7'; Surridge 38'; Baker-Whiting 88'	Report	Llorente 18'

Geodis Park, Nashville
Attendance: 11,887
Referee: Carly Shaw-MacLaren (Canada)

August 9, 2026
21:00 (20:00 UTC−5)

Austin FC (United States)	3–0	(Mexico) Puebla
Uzuni 4', 7', 34'	Report

Q2 Stadium, Austin
Referee: Jon Freemon (United States)

August 9, 2026
22:00 (19:00 UTC−7)

San Diego FC (United States)	1–0	(Mexico) Tijuana
Zamblé 22'	Report

Snapdragon Stadium, San Diego
Attendance: 31,538
Referee: Steven Madrigal (Costa Rica)

August 9, 2026
22:15 (19:15 UTC−7)

América (Mexico)	3–1	(United States) Portland Timbers
Rodríguez 6'; Violante 63'; Perea 88'	Report	Velde 19'

Providence Park, Portland
Attendance: 20,897
Referee: Walter López (Guatemala)

=== Matchday 3 ===
August 11, 2026
19:30

Columbus Crew (United States)	1–1	(Mexico) Pumas UNAM
Karumanchi 9'	Report	Angulo 45'
Penalties
Adams (penalty scored); Habroune (penalty missed); Giaccone (penalty scored); Camacho (penalty scored)	3–2	(penalty scored) Navas; (penalty missed) Martínez; (penalty scored) Vite; (penalty missed) R. López; (penalty missed) Nathan

ScottsMiracle-Gro Field, Columbus
Attendance: 9,100
Referee: Selvin Brown (Honduras)

August 11, 2026
19:30

Charlotte FC (United States)	0–1	(Mexico) Pachuca
	Report	Bautista 90+1'

Bank of America Stadium, Charlotte
Attendance: 15,561
Referee: Kwinsi Williams (Trinidad and Tobago)

August 11, 2026
20:00

FC Cincinnati (United States)	1–2	(Mexico) Atlas
Evander 44'	Report	Monzón 79'; Serrato 85'

TQL Stadium, Cincinnati
Attendance: 15,765
Referee: Fernando Hernández (Mexico)

August 11, 2026
20:30 (19:30 UTC−5)

Minnesota United FC (United States)	3–1	(Mexico) Atlante
González 59'; Pereyra 75', 87'	Report	Padelford 32' (o.g.)

Allianz Field, Saint Paul
Attendance: 11,453
Referee: Keylor Herrera (Costa Rica)

August 11, 2026
21:30 (19:30 UTC−6)

Real Salt Lake (United States)	3–0	(Mexico) Juárez
Guilavogui 29' (pen.); Solans 53'; Rodrigues 68'	Report

America First Field, Sandy
Attendance: 14,099
Referee: César Ramos (Mexico)

August 11, 2026
22:00 (20:00 UTC−6)

Tigres UANL (Mexico)	1–1	(Canada) Vancouver Whitecaps FC
Aguirre 19'	Report	Sabbi 79'
Penalties
Brunetta (penalty scored); Gorriarán (penalty scored); Aguirre (penalty missed); Rômulo (penalty scored); Sánchez (penalty scored); Garza (penalty missed); Joaquim (penalty scored)	5–4	(penalty scored) Gauld; (penalty scored) Sabbi; (penalty scored) Larraz; (penalty scored) Ocampo; (penalty missed) Laborda; (penalty missed) Priso; (penalty missed) Elloumi

Estadio Universitario, San Nicolás de los Garza
Attendance: 17,181
Referee: Iván Barton (El Salvador)

August 12, 2026
19:30

Orlando City SC (United States)	2–2	(Mexico) Atlético San Luis
Dike 31'; Ellis 69'	Report	Pérez Bouquet 79'; Rodríguez 90+7'
Penalties
Griezmann (penalty scored); Ellis (penalty scored); Caraballo (penalty scored); Iago Teodoro (penalty scored); Marín (penalty scored)	5–3	(penalty scored) Salles-Lamonge; (penalty scored) Mora; (penalty scored) Galdames; (penalty missed) Cruz

Inter.co Stadium, Orlando
Attendance: 7,544
Referee: Katia García (Mexico)

August 12, 2026
19:30

Inter Miami CF (United States)	2–3	(Mexico) León
Pintér 42'; Bright 54'	Report	Arcila 50', 85'; Domínguez 61'

Nu Stadium, Miami
Attendance: 21,318
Referee: Mario Escobar (Guatemala)

August 12, 2026
20:00 (19:00 UTC−5)

Monterrey (Mexico)	2–1	(United States) Nashville SC
Pineda 52'; Cuypers 90+2'	Report	Qasem 1'

Geodis Park, Nashville
Referee: Saíd Martínez (Honduras)

August 12, 2026
22:00 (20:00 UTC−6)

Toluca (Mexico)	3–1	(United States) FC Dallas
Vega 8' (pen.); Viñas 45+2'; Gutiérrez 50'	Report	Musa 9'

Estadio Nemesio Díez, Toluca
Referee: Walter López (Guatemala)

August 12, 2026
22:15 (19:15 UTC−7)

San Diego FC (United States)	3–2	(Mexico) Puebla
Søe 4'; Vázquez 76'; Þórhallsson 80'	Report	Velasco 30'; Mustre 86'

Snapdragon Stadium, San Diego
Attendance: 18,212
Referee: Daniel Quintero (Mexico)

August 12, 2026
22:30 (19:30 UTC−7)

Los Angeles FC (United States)	1–1	(Mexico) Querétaro
Bouanga 57'	Report	Ávila 12'
Penalties
Bouanga (penalty scored); Son Heung-min (penalty scored); Cheberko (penalty scored); Hollingshead (penalty scored); Porteous (penalty scored)	5–3	(penalty scored) Ávila; (penalty scored) Homenchenko; (penalty scored) Reyes; (penalty missed) Parra

BMO Stadium, Los Angeles
Attendance: 22,031
Referee: Filip Dujic (Canada)

August 12, 2026
22:30 (19:30 UTC−7)

Seattle Sounders FC (United States)	1–2	(Mexico) Guadalajara
Sandnes 13'	Report	Rey 61'; Sandoval 72'

Lumen Field, Seattle
Attendance: 35,286
Referee: Marco Ortíz (Mexico)

August 13, 2026
19:00

Philadelphia Union (United States)	0–2	(Mexico) Santos Laguna
	Report	Sordo 48'; Bullaude 51'

Subaru Park, Chester
Attendance: 5,820
Referee: Oshane Nation (Jamaica)

August 13, 2026
19:30

New York City FC (United States)	1–2	(Mexico) Necaxa
Parks 37'	Report	Valencia 58'; Torres 79'

Sports Illustrated Stadium, Harrison
Attendance: 11,281
Referee: Fernando Moron (Panama)

August 13, 2026
20:30 (19:30 UTC−5)

América (Mexico)	1–1	(United States) Austin FC
Gallagher 48' (o.g.)	Report	Uzuni 67'
Penalties
Veiga (penalty scored); Reyes (penalty scored); Cervantes (penalty scored); Cáceres (penalty scored); Álvarez (penalty scored); Borja (penalty missed)	5–6	(penalty scored) Rosales; (penalty scored) Sabović; (penalty scored) Ramirez; (penalty scored) Uzuni; (penalty scored) Alastuey; (penalty scored) Sánchez

Q2 Stadium, Austin
Referee: Juan Gabriel Calderón (Costa Rica)

August 13, 2026
21:00 (20:00 UTC−5)

Cruz Azul (Mexico)	1–2	(United States) Chicago Fire FC
Ibáñez 81'	Report	Dithejane 67', 90+3'

SeatGeek Stadium, Bridgeview
Attendance: 18,567
Referee: Pierre-Luc Lauzière (Canada)

August 13, 2026
22:30 (19:30 UTC−7)

Portland Timbers (United States)	3–1	(Mexico) Tijuana
Kelsy 40'; Antony 64'; Lassiter 77'	Report	El Ghezouani 19'

Providence Park, Portland
Attendance: 21,586
Referee: Ismael Cornejo (El Salvador)
