= Juan Valencia (footballer, born 2004) =

Colombian footballer

Personal information
- Full name: Juan David Valencia Longa
- Date of birth: 9 April 2004 (age 22)
- Place of birth: Riosucio, Caldas, Colombia
- Height: 1.79 m (5 ft 10 in)
- Position: Forward

Team information
- Current team: Necaxa
- Number: 90

Youth career
- Leones

Senior career*
Years	Team	Apps	(Gls)
2023–2025	Leones	57	(14)
2025	La Equidad	13	(3)
2026	Inter Bogotá	19	(2)
2026–	Necaxa	8	(2)
- * Club domestic league appearances and goals as of 17:17, 19 October 2026 (UTC)

Juan David Valencia Longa (born 9 April 2004) is a Colombian professional footballer who plays as a forward for Liga MX club Necaxa.

== Club career ==
Valencia came through the youth setup at Leones, where he played in the Categoría Primera B. On 17 May 2025, Valencia scored a hat trick in a 3–0 win over Bogotá FC.

In 2025, he joined Liga DIMAYOR club La Equidad, who became Inter Bogotá later that year. On 12 May 2026, he scored in a defeat to Atlético Nacional in the playoff quarter-finals.

On 14 July 2026, he was announced as a new signing for Liga MX club Necaxa. On 27 July, he made his debut as a late substitute against Monterrey, scoring almost immediately after coming on to help his side to a 2–1 win. On 13 August, he scored in a 2–1 win over New York City FC in the Leagues Cup. On 12 October, he scored a penalty in a 3–3 draw against Pachuca.

== Career statistics ==
As of 19 October 2026

Appearances and goals by club, season and competition
Club	Season	League			Cup		Continental		Other		Total	
Club	Season	Division	Apps	Goals	Apps	Goals	Apps	Goals	Apps	Goals	Apps	Goals
Leones	2023	Categoría Primera B	25	4	—		—		—		25	4
Leones	2024	Categoría Primera B	17	0	1	1	—		—		18	1
Leones	2025	Categoría Primera B	15	10	—		—		—		15	10
Leones	Total		57	14	1	1	0	0	0	0	58	15
La Equidad	2025	Liga DIMAYOR	13	3	—		—		—		13	3
Inter Bogotá	2026	Liga DIMAYOR	19	2	—		—		—		19	2
Necaxa	2026–27	Liga MX	8	2	—		—		2 (Note: Appearances in Leagues Cup)	1	10	3
Career total			97	21	1	1	0	0	2	1	100	22
