= Theresa May (disambiguation) =

Theresa May (born 1956) served as Prime Minister of the United Kingdom from 2016 to 2019.

Therese May or Teresa May may also refer to:

- Therese May (born 1943), American artist known for mixed-media quilts
- Teresa Baker (née May), mother of Catherine Baker Knoll
- Teresa May, English model and actress who appeared in the 1997 music video "Smack My Bitch Up" by the Prodigy

== See also ==
- Premiership of Theresa May, her premiership
- Tressa May, a nineteenth-century Oregon steamboat
