= Guardino =

Guardino is a surname. Notable people with the surname include:

- David Marius Guardino (1942 - 2007), American psychic and fraudster
- Harry Guardino (1925 – 1995), American actor
