= Mythili Kumar =

Mythili Kumar is a dancer, teacher, and choreographer. She performs the Bharatanatyam, Kuchipudi, and Odissi styles of Indian classical dance. She is the founder of Abhinaya Dance Company of San Jose and a lecturer in dance at University of California, Santa Cruz.

== Biography ==
As founder and director of Abhinaya Dance Company of San Jose since 1980, Kumar has trained and presented over one hundred dancers in their solo debuts and has collaborated extensively with several multi-cultural organizations. She has also taught classes at San Jose State University and Stanford University.

Kumar's two daughters, Rasika and Malavika, are active in the dance company and have been trained in classical Indian dance since age 4.

Collaborative performances include:

- The Guru with Kathak maestro Chitresh Das and his dance company
- In the Spirit (1993) with Japanese drumming corps San Jose Taiko, with Margaret Wingrove and her modern dance company
- The Ramayana (1997) with the Balinese music and dance ensemble Gamelan Sekar Jaya
- Vande Mataram - Mother, I bow to thee (1997) featuring three different Indian classical dance styles
- The Power of Saturn (1999) with Shadow Master Larry Reed and Shadow Light Productions
- Gandhi - the Mahatma (1995) for the Asian Art Museum in San Francisco

== Awards ==
In 2010, Kumar was awarded the Malonga Casquelourd Lifetime Achievement Award by San Francisco Ethnic Dance Festival. She received the choreographer's fellowships from 1989 until 1993 and a teacher's recognition certificate in 1998 from the National Endowment for the Arts.

== See also ==
- Indian women in dance
- List of people from San Jose, California

== Notes ==
- "Dancer enlivens Indian culture", San Jose Mercury News, April 13, 1990.
- "Dance teacher to get award from Cupertino", San Jose Mercury News, September 16, 1992.
- "The muse that makes her dance: Mythili Kumar keeps her Indian heritage alive in a land of pop and pizza", San Jose Mercury News, February 15, 1998.
- "Los Gatans honored as women of achievement", Los Gatos Weekly-Times, November 11, 1998.
- Kaplan, Shari (January 27, 1999), "Dramatic Gesture: Mythili Kumar shares Indian traditions with the art of the dance", Saratoga News.
- "Nurturing an Indian tradition in the Bay Area: how three teachers used varied approaches to an art form that takes years to master", San Jose Mercury News, November 15, 2003.
- "Keeping classical dance traditions alive - the Abhinaya Dance Company", Water, No Ice, November 15, 2008.
