= Adrián Alcaraz =

Paraguayan footballer

Personal information
- Full name: Adrián Alcaraz Torales
- Date of birth: 28 September 1999 (age 27)
- Place of birth: Acahay, Paraguay
- Height: 1.85 m (6 ft 1 in)
- Position: Forward

Team information
- Current team: Pachuca
- Number: 9

Youth career
- Libertad

Senior career*
Years	Team	Apps	(Gls)
2021–2025	Libertad	32	(2)
2021	→ Fernando de la Mora (loan)	10	(10)
2024	→ Guaraní (loan)	34	(10)
2025–2026	Olimpia	39	(13)
2026–	Pachuca	9	(0)

International career
2018	Paraguay U19	3	(0)
- * Club domestic league appearances and goals as of 17:59, 15 October 2026 (UTC)

Adrián Alcaraz Torales (born 28 September 1999) is a Paraguayan professional footballer who plays as a forward for Liga MX club Pachuca.

== Club career ==
=== Libertad ===
Alcaraz came through the youth setup at Libertad, spending time on loan at División Intermedia club Fernando de la Mora.

==== Loan to Guaraní ====
Ahead of the 2024 season, he was loaned to Guaraní. On 24 January, he scored a brace in his debut against Sol de América, following that up with another goal in the next game against Tacuary 4 days later. He became a key player and was a regular goalscorer, despite their issues scoring at some points of the season. On 10 January 2025, he returned to Libertad.

=== Olimpia ===
Amid interest from Argentine club Lanús, on 13 June 2025, he joined Olimpia, signing a 4-year contract, with Robert Rojas moving in the opposite direction to sign for Libertad. On 25 February 2026, he scored against his former club Libertad in a victory in the derby.

=== Pachuca ===
On 16 July 2026, it was announced that Alcaraz had moved abroad to join Liga MX club Pachuca, signing a 3-year contract. He scored his first goal on 4 August in a 3–1 defeat to FC Cincinnati in the 2026 Leagues Cup.

== International career ==
In September 2025, he was called up by Gustavo Alfaro to the Paraguay national team for World Cup qualifiers against Ecuador and Peru. He was amongst the 55 players in the preliminary squad ahead of the 2026 World Cup.

== Honours ==
Libertad

- Torneo Apertura: 2022 Apertura
