= Rafa Llorente =

Spanish footballer

Personal information
- Full name: Rafael Nicolás Llorente Sanz
- Date of birth: 6 December 2002 (age 23)
- Place of birth: Madrid, Spain
- Height: 1.87 m (6 ft 2 in)
- Position: Winger

Team information
- Current team: Atlético San Luis
- Number: 22

Youth career
- 2009–2020: Retamar
- 2020–2021: Las Rozas

Senior career*
Years	Team	Apps	(Gls)
2020–2021	Las Rozas	18	(0)
2021–2022	Gimnástica Segoviana	35	(8)
2022–2023	Real Madrid B	0	(0)
2023–2024	Cádiz B	17	(0)
2023–2024	→ Linares (loan)	35	(8)
2024–2026	Alcorcón	37	(5)
2026	Atlético Madrileño	17	(5)
2026–	Atlético San Luis	12	(4)
- * Club domestic league appearances and goals as of 20 October 2026

Rafael Nicolás Llorente Sanz (born 6 December 2002) is a Spanish professional footballer who plays as a winger for Liga MX club Atlético San Luis.

== Career ==
After making his senior debut with Segunda División B side Las Rozas CF in the 2020–21 season, Llorente joined Segunda División RFEF side Gimnástica Segoviana CF on 23 July 2021, after previously agreeing to join Real Madrid. He officially joined the latter side in July 2022, being assigned to the reserves in Primera Federación.

On 20 January 2023, Llorente signed a two-and-a-half-year contract with Cádiz CF, being initially assigned to the B-team in the fourth division. On 18 August, he was loaned to Linares Deportivo in division three for the 2023–24 campaign.

On 10 July 2024, Llorente moved to AD Alcorcón, recently relegated to the third tier.

On 25 June 2026, Llorente signed with Atlético San Luis.

== Career statistics ==
=== Club ===
As of 22 May 2022

Appearances and goals by club, season and competition
Club	Season	League			Cup		Europe		Other		Total	
Club	Season	Division	Apps	Goals	Apps	Goals	Apps	Goals	Apps	Goals	Apps	Goals
Las Rozas	2020–21	Segunda División B	18	0	1	0	–		0	0	19	0
Gimnástica Segoviana	2021–22	Segunda División RFEF	35	8	1	0	–		0	0	36	8
Real Madrid Castilla	2022–23	Primera División RFEF	0	0	–		–		0	0	0	0
Career total			53	8	2	0	0	0	0	0	55	9
