= Leagues Cup =

Club soccer competition between MLS and Liga MX teams

- Founded: 2019; 7 years ago
- Region: NAFU (Canada, Mexico, United States)
- Teams: 36
- Qualifier for: CONCACAF Champions Cup
- Related competitions: CONCACAF Caribbean Cup; CONCACAF Central American Cup
- Current champions: (Mexico) Toluca (1st title)
- Most championships: (United States) Columbus Crew (Mexico) Cruz Azul (United States) Inter Miami CF (Mexico) León (United States) Seattle Sounders FC (Mexico) Toluca (1 title each)
- Broadcaster(s): Apple TV; FS1 (English); Univision (Spanish)
- Motto: "New world. New game."
- Website: leaguescup.com
- 2026 Leagues Cup

The Leagues Cup is an annual soccer competition between clubs from Major League Soccer (MLS), the main soccer league in the United States and Canada, and Liga MX, the main soccer league in Mexico. It is mainly hosted in Canada and the United States. It began in July 2019 with four teams from both leagues participating. The first edition was a single-elimination tournament hosted in the United States with a final played in Whitney, Nevada, near Las Vegas, on September 18, 2019.

In 2023, the tournament was expanded to include all MLS clubs and all Liga MX clubs, and now functions as a regional cup for CONCACAF between the top division leagues in Mexico and United States and includes MLS teams that are based in Canada. The top three Leagues Cup teams, regardless of nation, qualify for the CONCACAF Champions Cup, with the champions receiving a bye to the round of 16. In 2025, the tournament contracted to only include the 18 best MLS clubs from the previous season and all 18 clubs from Liga MX.

== History ==
Major League Soccer and Liga MX clubs had previously played in the North American SuperLiga, which ran from 2007 to 2010. Both leagues also send clubs to the CONCACAF Champions Cup, which has been dominated by Mexican clubs, and the Campeones Cup, a single match played between the winners of the MLS Cup and the Campeón de Campeones. The two leagues began planning a bi-national, eight-team competition to complement the Champions Cup and provide Mexican clubs with matches to replace the Copa Libertadores in their calendar as soon as 2018. MLS and Liga MX announced a new partnership in March 2018 to create the Campeones Cup and explore options for other bi-national competitions between their clubs.

The Leagues Cup tournament was announced on May 29, 2019, featuring eight teams in its inaugural edition to be played during the summer. The announcement of the tournament was panned by soccer critics in the United States, who called it a meaningless friendly and "cash-grab" for American clubs. The MLS Players Association also expressed concerns over the tournament's creation on the basis of schedule congestion during the summertime. Sam Boyd Stadium in Whitney, Nevada was later announced as the host venue for the final and a broadcasting contract for the tournament was awarded to ESPN and TUDN (formerly Univision Deportes Network). This event was also televised on TSN and TVA Sports in Canada and Televisa in Mexico.

In July 2019, MLS and Liga MX announced that the second edition of the Leagues Cup in 2020 would feature 16 teams—eight from each league. The MLS participants would be drawn from the top four teams in each conference that do not qualify for the CONCACAF Champions League; the Liga MX participants would include the 2019 Apertura champion, 2020 Clausura champion, the 2019–20 Copa MX champion, and the next five best-placed teams in the 2019–20 season aggregate table the league. The tournament was canceled on May 19, 2020, amid the COVID-19 pandemic. The eight-team format debuted in the 2021 Leagues Cup, which was played in August and September. In the final at Allegiant Stadium in Paradise, Nevada, Mexican club León defeated Seattle Sounders FC, the first American finalist in the competition's history.

On April 14, 2022, MLS and Liga MX announced the 2022 Leagues Cup Showcase, which was held starting August 3, 2022, at SoFi Stadium in Inglewood, California. The event included a doubleheader of matches: LA Galaxy against C.D. Guadalajara and Los Angeles FC against Club América. On June 30, 2022, it was announced that the Leagues Cup Showcase was expanded to include three more matches—FC Cincinnati against C.D. Guadalajara at TQL Stadium in Cincinnati, Ohio; Nashville SC against Club América at Geodis Park in Nashville, Tennessee, on September 21; and Real Salt Lake against Atlas F.C. at Rio Tinto Stadium in Sandy, Utah, on September 22. The events served as a one-time replacement of the previously planned 2022 Leagues Cup which was not held due to fixture congestion from the 2022 FIFA World Cup and other factors.

The Leagues Cup was expanded in 2023 to include all MLS and Liga MX clubs, during a month-long pause in their respective seasons. It also became a qualification tournament for the 2024 CONCACAF Champions Cup with three berths for teams from North America. The Leagues Cup champion qualified directly to the round of 16, while the runner-up and third-place finisher earned round one berths. Inter Miami CF won the first edition of the expanded tournament in 2023, led by top goalscorer Lionel Messi.

On January 28, 2025, Major League Soccer announced that they would only send 18 representatives to the Leagues Cup for 2025 as part of their new competition guidelines, which only allowed teams to play in at most two cup competitions. Most of the teams in the 2024 MLS Cup playoffs qualified for Leagues Cup; the Vancouver Whitecaps, as winners of the 2024 Canadian Championship, had their place forfeited and given to expansion club San Diego FC.

=== Criticism ===
The addition of the Leagues Cup and subsequent schedule congestion led Major League Soccer to announce their intention not to field senior teams in the U.S. Open Cup, the domestic cup competition for the United States. The announcement was met with "widespread anger and condemnation" and the proposal was rejected by the United States Soccer Federation. A hybrid plan with eight MLS participants and MLS Next Pro reserve teams as replacements for the remaining teams was used for the 2024 U.S. Open Cup. Several Major League Soccer supporters' groups have announced boycotts of the Leagues Cup.

== Format ==
The first two editions of Leagues Cup featured four clubs from each league in an eight-team single-elimination knockout tournament, with the first two rounds hosted by the MLS club. The finals were played at neutral venues in the Las Vegas metropolitan area. The participating MLS teams in the first edition were invitees, but the second edition used league results for qualification; the four Liga MX participants were chosen based on their league results in both of these editions.

For the 2022 season, an official tournament was not held due to fixture congestion from the 2022 FIFA World Cup, among other factors.

For the 2023 and 2024 editions, the Leagues Cup included all MLS and Liga MX teams—47 teams in total with 77 matches hosted in Canada and the United States. The top 15 teams from each league were seeded into 15 groups based on their league standings from the previous season, while the remaining teams were drawn based on geographic proximity. The group stage had three matches in a round-robin format and the top two teams qualified for the knockout stage. Two teams receive byes to the knockout stage: the reigning MLS Cup champion and highest-ranked Liga MX champion from either the previous Apertura and Clausura. The knockout stage was single-elimination on a fixed bracket.

The 2025 Leagues Cup format was altered to maximize the number of inter-league matches. This year included 18 out of the 30 MLS teams (those who qualified for the MLS Cup playoffs in most instances), as well as all 18 Liga MX teams, for a total of 36 participants. Each team plays three games against teams from the other league and the top four teams from each league advance to the knockout stage. The quarterfinal matches are guaranteed to be MLS vs Liga MX like in the group stage. All games are again held in Canada and the United States, but unlike the past two years, the competition also takes place during the MLS and Liga MX seasons.

Since 2023, the tournament uses a unique points-scoring system in which winning teams earn three points, while draws go straight to penalties, with the shootout-winning team earning two points, and the shootout runner-up earning one.

== Trophy ==
The Leagues Cup trophy was unveiled in September 2019 and consists of a 22-pound (10.0 kg) silver bowl atop a pedestal. It is 16.5 inches (42 cm) in height and 16.1 inches (41 cm) wide. A replica trophy will be gifted to the winners following 12 months with the original trophy.

== Broadcasting ==
Since 2023, all Leagues Cup matches have been broadcast worldwide on MLS Season Pass, an online streaming platform operated by Apple under its Apple TV streaming service. All matches have commentary in English and Spanish, while those involving Canadian teams also include French commentary. A select group of matches are also set to be broadcast on television networks using their own crews, including Fox Sports and TUDN in the United States; and TSN and RDS in Canada.

== Results ==
=== Finals ===
Ed.	Year	Winners	Score	Runners-up	Venue	City	Att.
1	2019	Cruz Azul (Mexico)	2–1	(Mexico) Tigres UANL	Sam Boyd Stadium	Whitney, Nevada	20,132
–	2020	(Canceled due to COVID-19 pandemic)					
2	2021	León (Mexico)	3–2	(United States) Seattle Sounders FC	Allegiant Stadium	Paradise, Nevada	24,824
–	2022	(No champion crowned) (Note: Held only as exhibition matches between participating MLS and Liga MX teams due to fixture congestion.)					
3	2023	Inter Miami CF (United States)	1–1 (10–9 p)	(United States) Nashville SC	Geodis Park	Nashville, Tennessee	30,109
4	2024	Columbus Crew (United States)	3–1	(United States) Los Angeles FC	Lower.com Field	Columbus, Ohio	20,190
5	2025	Seattle Sounders FC (United States)	3–0	(United States) Inter Miami CF	Lumen Field	Seattle, Washington	69,314
6	2026	Toluca (Mexico)	2–0	(Mexico) Monterrey	Shell Energy Stadium	Houston, Texas	21,144

=== Third place playoffs ===
Ed.	Year	Third place	Score	Fourth place	Venue	City	Att.
3	2023	Philadelphia Union (United States)	3–0	(Mexico) Monterrey	Subaru Park	Chester, Pennsylvania	17,731
4	2024	Colorado Rapids (United States)	2–2 (3–1 p)	(United States) Philadelphia Union	Subaru Park	Chester, Pennsylvania	8,417
5	2025	LA Galaxy (United States)	2–1	(United States) Orlando City SC	Dignity Health Sports Park	Carson, California	12,129
6	2026	León (Mexico)	1–0	(Mexico) América	Shell Energy Stadium	Houston, Texas	21,144

== Performances ==
=== Performance by club ===
Team	Titles	Runners-up	Third place	Fourth place
(United States) Inter Miami CF	1 (2023)	1 (2025)		
(United States) Seattle Sounders FC	1 (2025)	1 (2021)		
(Mexico) León	1 (2021)		1 (2026)	
(Mexico) Cruz Azul	1 (2019)			
(United States) Columbus Crew	1 (2024)			
(Mexico) Toluca	1 (2026)			
(Mexico) Monterrey		1 (2026)		1 (2023)
(Mexico) Tigres UANL		1 (2019)		
(United States) Nashville SC		1 (2023)		
(United States) Los Angeles FC		1 (2024)		
(United States) Philadelphia Union			1 (2023)	1 (2024)
(United States) Colorado Rapids			1 (2024)	
(United States) LA Galaxy			1 (2025)	
(United States) Orlando City SC				1 (2025)
(Mexico) América				1 (2026)

=== Performance by nation ===
Nation	Titles	Runners-up	Third place	Fourth place	Total
United States	3	4	3	2	12
Mexico	3	2	1	2	8
Canada					0

The third place playoff was added in 2023.

== Statistics ==
=== Top goalscorers ===
As of matches played September 6, 2026

Rank	Player	Goals	Apps	Ratio	Team(s) (goals/apps)
1	(Gabon) Denis Bouanga	15	15	1.00	(United States) Los Angeles FC
2	(Argentina) Lionel Messi	14	13	1.08	(United States) Inter Miami CF
3	(Uruguay) Diego Rossi	10	14	0.71	(United States) Columbus Crew (8/8), (Mexico) Monterrey (2/6)
4	(South Africa) Bongokuhle Hlongwane	9	11	0.82	(United States) Minnesota United FC
5	(Israel) Tai Baribo	7	7	1.00	(United States) Philadelphia Union
5	(Colombia) Cucho Hernández	7	8	0.88	(United States) Columbus Crew
5	(Hungary) Dániel Gazdag	7	20	0.35	(United States) Philadelphia Union (6/13), (United States) Columbus Crew (1/7)
8	(Mexico) Germán Berterame	6	7	0.86	(Mexico) Monterrey
8	(Brazil) Evander	6	11	0.55	(United States) Portland Timbers (2/5), (United States) FC Cincinnati (4/6)
8	(Uruguay) Brian Rodríguez	6	16	0.38	(Mexico) América

== See also ==
- CONCACAF Central American Cup – Zonal championships for club sides from Central America
- CONCACAF Caribbean Cup – Zonal championships for club sides from the Caribbean, Suriname, French Guiana and Guyana.
- Campeones Cup – Zonal super cup for the champions of MLS and Liga MX
- North American SuperLiga – previous cross border competition between Mexican and MLS teams.
- CONCACAF League
- NWSL x Liga MX Femenil Summer Cup
