= James Caprell =

American artist

James Caprell, Core, 2007

James Caprell is an abstract artist whose work is known as action painting, or process painting. Caprell's pieces are created using a variety of techniques, then arranged by series. However, the unifying characteristics of his collection is the intense combinations of color and kinetic composition within each painting intended to stimulate an emotional response for the viewer.

== Biography ==
Born in 1976 in San Jose, California, Caprell is a first generation Armenian American. After graduating from DePauw University, he moved to New York City for a job in investment banking at J.P. Morgan & Co. After a few years on Wall Street, Caprell left to pursue the arts. He remained in New York for ten years where he exhibited privately from his Harlem and Manhattan studios and also from galleries in Miami and Atlanta before he moved back to California where he works out of his studio in Los Angeles.

James was also chief warden for Indiana Delta chapter of Sigma Alpha Epsilon.
