= David Marius Guardino =

American psychic and fraudster (1942-2007)

- Born: August 24, 1942; San Jose, California, U.S.
- Died: May 10, 2007 (aged 64); Fort Worth, Texas, U.S.
- Occupation(s): Psychic, fraudster
- Years active: 1972–2006

David Marius Guardino (August 24, 1942 - May 10, 2007) was a psychic of some repute in Oregon, Las Vegas and Tennessee, in the 1980s and 1990s. He pleaded guilty to fraud charges in 1988 and was convicted of tax evasion in 2007.

== Biography ==
Born on August 24, 1942, in California, Guardino was the eldest among six siblings to Mariano J. (Monte) Guardino and Harriet Smith Guardino. The family later settled in Oregon, fostering a deeply devout Catholic upbringing for the children. Guardino pursued his education at Southern Oregon College, earning a degree in Philosophy before embarking on a career in social work. He eventually moved to Las Vegas when he began to work as a psychic, then to his wife's hometown of Lenoir City.

First using the pseudonym Jamil, David Guardino became known in the 1970s, billing himself as the World's Greatest Psychic and the Psychic to the Stars. From his home in Oregon, he moved to Las Vegas, to Tennessee.

He claimed to possess the power of telekinesis, or psychokinesis to read people's magnetic fields, an ability he believes has been bestowed upon him and other psychics by a divine being. Guardino allegedly used his powers to influence people through spells (he called those "whammies"), such as targeting politicians to pass legislation.

In the early 1980s, Guardino used classified advertising in newspapers to recruit clients, claiming to be a business consultant as well as "the world's greatest psychic". The ad copy claimed he was proficient in predictions and used psychokinesis. The Copley newspaper chain ran regular columns featuring Guardino answering questions from readers. In the same period, Guardino promoted the concept of using hypnosis as a birth control method for women.

Guardino claimed to have conducted a séance at Graceland in 1982, during which he communicated with the deceased Elvis Presley. This was contradicted by a spokesperson of the corporation managing Graceland, who said there was never any séance held on the site. Other notable people Guardino says he had post-mortem conversations with include Abraham Lincoln, Natalie Wood, Freddie Prinze, Marilyn Monroe, John Lennon and Adolf Hitler.

== Criminal activities ==
Legal issues dogged him almost from the beginning. The consumer protection unit of the Oregon Attorney General Office launched a civil lawsuit after eight of David's former clients failed to get their money back after Guardino's promises failed to materialize. Guardino counter-sued the State of Oregon for prejudice against his psychic business.

Guardino pleaded guilty to defrauding clients in September 1988. As per the plea agreement, he was placed on probation and agreed to reimburse $100,000 to a group of clients. As he failed to make the payments, he was sentenced to five years in prison in 1989. His psychic business continued to operate and to use his name in advertising.

In February 2007, he was sentenced to 21 months in prison for tax evasion, related to one million dollars of undisclosed income between 1998 and 2000. He was then living in Caryville. While the case was before the courts, Guardino racked up separate charges of aggravated burglary and domestic violence when he allegedly attacked his wife and another man in a Lake City motel.

== Personal life ==
He married Dedra Jones, 20 years his junior, in 1982.

Guardino died on May 10, 2007, at age 64 from complications of obesity and diabetes.
