= 2026 Leagues Cup =

Soccer tournament held in Canada, the United States, and Mexico

- 2026 Leagues Cup logo

Tournament details
- Host countries: Canada; Mexico; United States
- Dates: August 4 – September 6
- Teams: 36 (from 3 associations)

Final positions
- Champions: (Mexico) Toluca (1st title)
- Runners-up: (Mexico) Monterrey
- Third place: (Mexico) León
- Fourth place: (Mexico) América

Tournament statistics
- Matches played: 62
- Goals scored: 176 (2.84 per match)
- Top scorer(s): (Colombia) Daniel Arcila (Albania) Myrto Uzuni (4 goals each)
- Best player: (Mexico) Alexis Vega
- Best goalkeeper: (Mexico) Óscar García

The 2026 Leagues Cup was the sixth edition of the Leagues Cup, an international club soccer tournament contested by Major League Soccer (MLS) and Liga MX clubs in North America. It was held from August 4 to September 6, featuring 36 teams. Like the 2025 edition, only the top 18 MLS teams from the 2025 season qualified for the tournament. All 18 Liga MX clubs participated.

Seattle Sounders FC were the defending champions, having won their first Leagues Cup title by defeating Inter Miami CF 3–0 in the 2025 final. This was the first edition of the tournament to feature games hosted in Mexico, with four matches in Phase One being played in the country.

Toluca won their first Leagues Cup title by defeating Monterrey 2–0 in the final.

== Format ==
The tournament consisted of a group stage, known as "Phase One", and a knockout phase. During phase one, teams played three games against teams in the other league (i.e., all games were MLS vs Liga MX). The top four teams from each league advanced to the knockout stage, which consisted of quarterfinals, semifinals and a final. Like previous editions of the Leagues Cup, the top three clubs qualified for the CONCACAF Champions Cup.

The 2026 tournament followed the same format as the 2025 tournament. In Phase One, teams earned three points for a win in regulation, two points for a win in a penalty shoot-out, or one point for a loss in a penalty shoot-out. In the event two or more teams ended the group stage tied on points, these tiebreakers in order were used for ranking:

1. Greater goal difference.
2. Greater number of wins in regular time.
3. Greater number of goals scored.
4. Fewer number of goals conceded.
5. Fewer points in the team’s Fair Play Table.
6. A draw organized by the Organizing Committee.

== Teams ==
Thirty-six teams participated in the Leagues Cup, including all 18 Liga MX teams and 18 out of 30 MLS teams. The 18 MLS teams qualified for Leagues Cup by reaching the 2025 MLS Cup playoffs.

=== Draw ===
To determine matchups, all teams were placed into a combined ranking that used the 2025 Supporters' Shield table for MLS teams and the most recent 34 matches in the 2025 Clausura and Apertura seasons for Liga MX teams. These teams were then divided into an East region and a West region based on geographical and performance criteria. Within each region, teams were assigned to tiers based on the combined ranking, with the restriction that each tier included three teams from each league.

Eastern clubs
Rank	Tier	Team	League
4	Tier 1	Cruz Azul	Liga MX
5	Tier 1	Philadelphia Union	MLS
6	Tier 1	FC Cincinnati	MLS
7	Tier 1	Inter Miami CF	MLS
11	Tier 1	Monterrey	Liga MX
20	Tier 1	Pachuca	Liga MX
12	Tier 2	Charlotte FC	MLS
14	Tier 2	New York City FC	MLS
16	Tier 2	Nashville SC	MLS
22	Tier 2	Necaxa	Liga MX
28	Tier 2	León	Liga MX
29	Tier 2	Pumas UNAM	Liga MX
17	Tier 3	Columbus Crew	MLS
18	Tier 3	Chicago Fire FC	MLS
19	Tier 3	Orlando City SC	MLS
32	Tier 3	Atlas	Liga MX
33	Tier 3	Atlético San Luis	Liga MX
35	Tier 3	Santos Laguna	Liga MX

Western clubs
Rank	Tier	Team	League
1	Tier 1	Toluca	Liga MX
2	Tier 1	Tigres UANL	Liga MX
3	Tier 1	América	Liga MX
8	Tier 1	San Diego FC	MLS
9	Tier 1	Vancouver Whitecaps FC	MLS
10	Tier 1	Los Angeles FC	MLS
13	Tier 2	Minnesota United FC	MLS
15	Tier 2	Seattle Sounders FC	MLS
21	Tier 2	Guadalajara	Liga MX
23	Tier 2	Juárez	Liga MX
24	Tier 2	Austin FC	MLS
27	Tier 2	Tijuana	Liga MX
25	Tier 3	FC Dallas	MLS
26	Tier 3	Portland Timbers	MLS
30	Tier 3	Real Salt Lake	MLS
31	Tier 3	Querétaro	Liga MX
34	Tier 3	Atlante	Liga MX
36	Tier 3	Puebla	Liga MX

=== Regional groupings ===
Finally, six "regional groupings" were formed by drawing one team per league from each of the three tiers of a region. Teams played three matches against teams from their set who were not from their league.

Eastern 1
Tier	Team	League
1	FC Cincinnati	MLS
1	Pachuca	Liga MX
2	Charlotte FC	MLS
2	Pumas UNAM	Liga MX
3	Columbus Crew	MLS
3	Atlas	Liga MX

Eastern 2
Tier	Team	League
1	Inter Miami CF	MLS
1	Monterrey	Liga MX
2	Nashville SC	MLS
2	León	Liga MX
3	Orlando City SC	MLS
3	Atlético San Luis	Liga MX

Eastern 3
Tier	Team	League
1	Cruz Azul	Liga MX
1	Philadelphia Union	MLS
2	New York City FC	MLS
2	Necaxa	Liga MX
3	Chicago Fire FC	MLS
3	Santos Laguna	Liga MX

Western 1
Tier	Team	League
1	Tigres UANL	Liga MX
1	Vancouver Whitecaps FC	MLS
2	Minnesota United FC	MLS
2	Juárez	Liga MX
3	Real Salt Lake	MLS
3	Atlante	Liga MX

Western 2
Tier	Team	League
1	Toluca	Liga MX
1	Los Angeles FC	MLS
2	Seattle Sounders FC	MLS
2	Guadalajara	Liga MX
3	FC Dallas	MLS
3	Querétaro	Liga MX

Western 3
Tier	Team	League
1	América	Liga MX
1	San Diego FC	MLS
2	Austin FC	MLS
2	Tijuana	Liga MX
3	Portland Timbers	MLS
3	Puebla	Liga MX

== Round dates ==
The schedule of the competition was as follows.

Schedule for 2026 Leagues Cup
Phase	Round	Date
League stage	Matchday 1	August 4–6
League stage	Matchday 2	August 7–9
League stage	Matchday 3	August 11–13
Knockout stage	Quarterfinals	August 25–27
Knockout stage	Semifinals	September 1–2
Knockout stage	Third place playoff	September 6
Knockout stage	Final	September 6

== League phase ==
=== Table ===
Liga MX

Pos	Team	Pld	W	PW	PL	L	GF	GA	GD	Pts	Qualification
1	León	3	3	0	0	0	6	3	+3	9	Advance to knockout stage
2	América	3	2	0	1	0	7	3	+4	7	Advance to knockout stage
3	Toluca	3	2	0	0	1	6	2	+4	6	Advance to knockout stage
4	Monterrey	3	2	0	0	1	5	4	+1	6	Advance to knockout stage
5	Cruz Azul	3	2	0	0	1	4	3	+1	6	
6	Juárez	3	2	0	0	1	5	5	0	6	
7	Tigres UANL	3	0	3	0	0	2	2	0	6	
8	Guadalajara	3	1	0	1	1	3	3	0	4	
9	Pachuca	3	1	0	0	2	3	5	−2	3	
10	Santos Laguna	3	1	0	0	2	3	5	−2	3	
11	Atlas	3	1	0	0	2	3	6	−3	3	
12	Necaxa	3	1	0	0	2	3	6	−3	3	
13	Atlante	3	1	0	0	2	2	7	−5	3	
14	Atlético San Luis	3	0	0	1	2	5	10	−5	1	
15	Querétaro	3	0	0	1	2	1	6	−5	1	
16	Pumas UNAM	3	0	0	1	2	1	6	−5	1	
17	Tijuana	3	0	0	0	3	1	6	−5	0	
18	Puebla	3	0	0	0	3	4	11	−7	0	

Source: Leagues Cup

See above for tie-breaking criteria.

Major League Soccer

Pos	Team	Pld	W	PW	PL	L	GF	GA	GD	Pts	Qualification
1	Chicago Fire FC	3	3	0	0	0	7	2	+5	9	Advance to knockout stage
2	Austin FC	3	2	1	0	0	6	1	+5	8	Advance to knockout stage
3	Columbus Crew	3	2	1	0	0	6	3	+3	8	Advance to knockout stage
4	Real Salt Lake	3	2	0	1	0	8	1	+7	7	Advance to knockout stage
5	Los Angeles FC	3	1	2	0	0	3	2	+1	7	
6	Charlotte FC	3	2	0	0	1	5	1	+4	6	
7	Portland Timbers	3	2	0	0	1	9	6	+3	6	
8	FC Cincinnati	3	2	0	0	1	6	3	+3	6	
9	FC Dallas	3	2	0	0	1	4	3	+1	6	
10	San Diego FC	3	2	0	0	1	5	5	0	6	
11	Orlando City SC	3	1	1	0	1	5	5	0	5	
12	Minnesota United FC	3	1	0	1	1	4	3	+1	4	
13	Nashville SC	3	1	0	0	2	5	4	+1	3	
14	Inter Miami CF	3	1	0	0	2	7	7	0	3	
15	New York City FC	3	1	0	0	2	4	4	0	3	
16	Seattle Sounders FC	3	1	0	0	2	4	5	−1	3	
17	Philadelphia Union	3	1	0	0	2	3	4	−1	3	
18	Vancouver Whitecaps FC	3	0	0	1	2	2	5	−3	1	

Source: Leagues Cup

See above for tie-breaking criteria.

=== Results ===
Matchday 1
Team 1	Score	Team 2
Columbus Crew (United States)	3–1	(Mexico) Atlas
FC Cincinnati (United States)	3–1	(Mexico) Pachuca
Charlotte FC (United States)	3–0	(Mexico) Pumas UNAM
Minnesota United FC (United States)	1–2	(Mexico) Juárez
Tigres UANL (Mexico)	1–1 (6–5 p)	(United States) Real Salt Lake
Vancouver Whitecaps FC (Canada)	0–1	(Mexico) Atlante
Inter Miami CF (United States)	4–2	(Mexico) Atlético San Luis
Monterrey (Mexico)	1–2	(United States) Orlando City SC
Nashville SC (United States)	0–1	(Mexico) León
FC Dallas (United States)	2–0	(Mexico) Querétaro
Los Angeles FC (United States)	1–1 (5–4 p)	(Mexico) Guadalajara
Toluca (Mexico)	3–0	(United States) Seattle Sounders FC
New York City FC (United States)	2–0	(Mexico) Santos Laguna
Cruz Azul (Mexico)	1–0	(United States) Philadelphia Union
Chicago Fire FC (United States)	2–0	(Mexico) Necaxa
Austin FC (United States)	2–0	(Mexico) Tijuana
Portland Timbers (United States)	5–2	(Mexico) Puebla
América (Mexico)	3–1	(United States) San Diego FC

Matchday 2
Team 1	Score	Team 2
Charlotte FC (United States)	2–0	(Mexico) Atlas
Columbus Crew (United States)	2–1	(Mexico) Pachuca
FC Cincinnati (United States)	2–0	(Mexico) Pumas UNAM
Tigres UANL (Mexico)	0–0 (4–2 p)	(United States) Minnesota United FC
Vancouver Whitecaps FC (Canada)	1–3	(Mexico) Juárez
Orlando City SC (United States)	1–2	(Mexico) León
Inter Miami CF (United States)	1–2	(Mexico) Monterrey
Guadalajara (Mexico)	0–1	(United States) FC Dallas
Real Salt Lake (United States)	4–0	(Mexico) Atlante
Toluca (Mexico)	0–1	(United States) Los Angeles FC
Seattle Sounders FC (United States)	3–0	(Mexico) Querétaro
Cruz Azul (Mexico)	2–1	(United States) New York City FC
Philadelphia Union (United States)	3–1	(Mexico) Necaxa
Chicago Fire FC (United States)	3–1	(Mexico) Santos Laguna
Nashville SC (United States)	4–1	(Mexico) Atlético San Luis
Austin FC (United States)	3–0	(Mexico) Puebla
América (Mexico)	3–1	(United States) Portland Timbers
San Diego FC (United States)	1–0	(Mexico) Tijuana

Matchday 3
Team 1	Score	Team 2
Columbus Crew (United States)	1–1 (3–2 p)	(Mexico) Pumas UNAM
Charlotte FC (United States)	0–1	(Mexico) Pachuca
FC Cincinnati (United States)	1–2	(Mexico) Atlas
Minnesota United FC (United States)	3–1	(Mexico) Atlante
Real Salt Lake (United States)	3–0	(Mexico) Juárez
Tigres UANL (Mexico)	1–1 (5–4 p)	(Canada) Vancouver Whitecaps FC
Orlando City SC (United States)	2–2 (5–3 p)	(Mexico) Atlético San Luis
Inter Miami CF (United States)	2–3	(Mexico) León
Monterrey (Mexico)	2–1	(United States) Nashville SC
Toluca (Mexico)	3–1	(United States) FC Dallas
Los Angeles FC (United States)	1–1 (5–3 p)	(Mexico) Querétaro
San Diego FC (United States)	3–2	(Mexico) Puebla
Seattle Sounders FC (United States)	1–2	(Mexico) Guadalajara
Philadelphia Union (United States)	0–2	(Mexico) Santos Laguna
New York City FC (United States)	1–2	(Mexico) Necaxa
Cruz Azul (Mexico)	1–2	(United States) Chicago Fire FC
América (Mexico)	1–1 (5–6 p)	(United States) Austin FC
Portland Timbers (United States)	3–1	(Mexico) Tijuana

== Knockout stage ==
The quarterfinal pairings were determined as follows:

- Liga MX 1 vs MLS 4
- Liga MX 3 vs MLS 2
- Liga MX 4 vs MLS 1
- Liga MX 2 vs MLS 3

=== Bracket ===
Quarterfinals
August 25 – Commerce City
(Mexico) León	3
(United States) Real Salt Lake	0
August 26 – Harrison
(Mexico) Toluca	2
(United States) Austin FC	0
August 25 – Bridgeview
(Mexico) Monterrey	2
(United States) Chicago Fire FC	1
August 26 – Carson
(Mexico) América	2
(United States) Columbus Crew	0

Semifinals
September 2 – Houston
(Mexico) León	0
(Mexico) Toluca	2
September 2 – Carson
(Mexico) Monterrey (p)	2 (5)
(Mexico) América	2 (4)

Final
September 6 – Houston
(Mexico) Toluca	2
(Mexico) Monterrey	0
Third place playoff
September 6 – Houston
(Mexico) León	1
(Mexico) América	0

=== Quarterfinals ===
Quarterfinals
Team 1	Score	Team 2
Monterrey (Mexico)	2–1	(United States) Chicago Fire FC
León (Mexico)	3–0	(United States) Real Salt Lake
Toluca (Mexico)	2–0	(United States) Austin FC
América (Mexico)	2–0	(United States) Columbus Crew

=== Semifinals ===
Semifinals
Team 1	Score	Team 2
Toluca (Mexico)	2–0	(Mexico) León
América (Mexico)	2–2 (4–5 p)	(Mexico) Monterrey

=== Third place playoff ===
The winners of the third place playoff qualified as the last seed to the 2027 CONCACAF Champions Cup.

Third place playoff
Team 1	Score	Team 2
León (Mexico)	1–0	(Mexico) América

=== Final ===
Both clubs that made the final qualified for the 2027 CONCACAF Champions Cup, with the winners qualifying directly to the round of 16.

Final
Team 1	Score	Team 2
Toluca (Mexico)	2–0	(Mexico) Monterrey

== Statistics ==
=== Top goalscorers ===
Team eliminated for this round.

Rank	Player	Team	MD1	MD2	MD3	QF	SF	3rd	F	Total
1	(Colombia) Daniel Arcila	(Mexico) León	1	1	2					4
1	(Albania) Myrto Uzuni	(United States) Austin FC		3	1					4
3	(Colombia) Diber Cambindo	(Mexico) León				2		1		3
3	(Belgium) Hugo Cuypers	(Mexico) Monterrey	1	1	1					3
3	(Brazil) Helinho	(Mexico) Toluca	1			1			1	3
3	(Costa Rica) Ariel Lassiter	(United States) Portland Timbers	2		1					3
3	(Uruguay) Brian Rodríguez	(Mexico) América	1	1		1				3
3	(Uruguay) Federico Viñas	(Mexico) Toluca	1		1		1			3
9	24 players									2
