= Gabriela Sepúlveda =

- Also known as: La Nueva Reina Del Regional
- Born: Gabriela Isabel Sepúlveda; September 21, 1999 (age 27); San Jose, California, U.S.
- Genre: Regional Mexican - Mariachi - Pop - Norteño
- Occupation: Singer - songwriter - actress
- Instruments: Piano
- Years active: 2008 - present
- Website: gabrielasepulvedamusic.com

Gabriela Sepúlveda (born September 21, 1999) is an American singer-songwriter, and actress of Mexican-Chilean descent singing in both Spanish as well as English. She first gained national and international recognition performing on major television reality shows including the popular Saturday night Univision program, Sabádo Gigante, Tengo Talento Mucho Talento in 2011), La Voz Kids in 2013 and American Idol in 2016. Sepulveda made her acting debut in 2017 for the Telemundo network series, Jenni Rivera: Mariposa de Barrio, where she played, Jenicka López, the youngest daughter of Mexican-American singer, Jenni Rivera. She is known for performing the U.S. anthem for the San Francisco Bay Area sport's teams the San Francisco Giants, the San Francisco 49ers, the San Jose Earthquakes, the San Jose Sharks, and the Oakland A's. She became the first person to sing, Miley Cyrus's hit song, “The Climb” in Spanish from the feature film Hannah Montana: The Movie, obtaining rights from the Walt Disney Company in 2012 to approve to Spanish adaptation.

In June 2022, she was the recipient of the award, Revelación Juvenil Del Año en Regional Mexicano (Youth Revelation of Regional Mexican Music of the Year) at Grandeza Hispana International Awards held in Mexico City in June 2022. Sepulveda has collaborated with Spanish recording artist and record producer, Abraham Mateo, in 2012 for the song "Un 5 De Agosto." A song dedicated to the 33 rescued Chilean Miners from the Copiapó Mining Incident. Sepulveda has also collaborated with major Regional Mexican artists including Luis Coronel in July 2022 with his song, "Mi Niña Traviesa," during his concert at the Stanislaus County Fair, the Grammy winning Regional Mexican band, Banda Los Sebastianes, with the song from Grupo Liberación, "Ese Loco Soy Yo" during their concert at Salinas Sports Complex. Sepulveda has opened concerts for regional mexican artists Charlie Zaa, El Dasa, Banda Los Sebastianes and has been invited various times to sing the U.S. She has been featured on several radio shows, talk shows, and magazines including Acceso Total, Dante Night Show, Otra Noche con Ustedes, Mañana Latina, Famosos, Buenos Días con Celina, Stereo Play Beat, El Show International de Paula Maruri, Encuentro en la Bahía, El Show Pistolero de Chicago, Comunidad del Valle, and in La Bamba Magazine.

== Life and career ==
=== 1999–2015: Early life and career beginnings ===
Gabriela Sepulveda was born and raised in San Jose, California. Her mother, Diana, is of Mexican descent and her father, Omar Sepulveda, is of Chilean descent. She was exposed to music early on in her life as her father plays several South American instruments and composes Andean music. She stated in one of her interviews that, “the passion of music runs in the family.” Gabriela has mentioned in several interviews that she was always an entertainer even at a very young age, singing and making jokes to the point where her family ended up nicknaming her, “The Showgirl.” The first time she sang on stage was at her elementary school talent show singing Selena Quintanilla's song “Como La Flor.” After that, at the age of eight, Gabriela was entered by her mother in a contest in Gilroy, California called, Juguemos a Cantar. She won third place singing a Mexican folk song called “Los Laureles.” In 2010, Sepulveda released her first CD is 2010 titled Mis Primeras Canciones. She wrote her first song “Ya No Te Quiero” at the age of nine and released the song on her new YouTube channel when she was twelve. Gabriela continued to sing in various community events around the Bay Area and was also invited to perform at several Mariachi Festivals in San Jose. She performed in Rosarito, Mexico and at the “Fiestas Jalisco” in Chicago, Illinois. Sepulveda released her second CD in 2015 called Cantos del Corazon.

Sepulveda was only 8 when she began performing on television shows. After her third place winning in Juguemos a Cantar, Sepulveda began to get invited to various radio shows around the Bay Area as well as notable Spanish-speaking programs. She was invited to sing in Univision's television shows, Al Despertar, and Encuentro en La Bahía. Gabriela went to participate in two segments of the popular show Sabado Gigante performing for a total of four times on the family-friendly program. She participated in the first segment, Los Rancheritos, twice, once in 2009 and again in 2010, winning both times.

In 2011 she participated in another segment, Estellas de Futuro and made it to the semi-finals. At only 11 years old, Sepulveda was invited by Estrella TV to audition for the competition, Tengo Talento Mucho Talento, in Los Angeles, California. Inspired by the framework of the America's Got Talent, Sepulveda auditioned and was said "yes" by all three judges, Héctor Suárez, Patricia Manterola, and Pepe Garza. She was eliminated in the semi-finals.

In 2013, at the age of 13, Gabriela Sepulveda was invited by the television station, Telemundo, to audition for La Voz Kids in Miami, Florida. The show followed the format of the North American television show, The Voice. The judges were Roberto Tapia, Paulina Rubio, and Prince Royce for that season.Gabriela auditioned in the blind auditions with the song “Stronger” by Kelly Clarkson. Tapia was the judge to turn his chair around for the young singer, stating that he found her voice to be very versatile and able to sing more than one genre of music. Sepulveda was on the show for the entirety of part one but was eliminated before part two, the battle rounds.

In 2016, Gabriela Sepulveda was invited by Fox to audition for American Idol in its last farewell season. Sepulveda auditioned with the song, “Will You Still Love Me Tomorrow,” by The Shirelles for the judges Jennifer Lopez, Keith Urban, and Harry Conick Jr. All three judges said “yes” and she was given the Golden Ticket to Hollywood. She was eliminated later in the season.

=== 2014–2016 Pero Nadie and Venezuela music success ===
Sepulveda's third single, “Pero Nadie" (2014), a ranchera style ballad song, written in collaboration with her mother and manager, Diana Sepulveda began to draw the attention of Venezuelan press. She mentioned in her 2017 interview with El Diario de Guayana, that the song was inspired by the dramatic and intense nature of telenovelas (Spanish soap operas) and drove her to make the song intense and dramatic as well. The song was later nominated in the “World Category” for the Josie Music Awards in Nashville, Tennessee in 2016, winning the award for “Song of the Year." The song was played on Venezuelan radio station, Esplendida 91.9 and received a positive reception. She has been featured in many Venezuelan magazine and newspaper articles, with one article stating "'Pero Nadie' leads the country's radio stations, thanks to the support of listeners, who have become Gabriela's fans in a short time." Her first fan club was established in Venezuela.”

=== 2017: Telemundo and Netflix acting debut ===
Gabriela Sepulveda made her televised acting debut in Telemundo's, Jenni Rivera: Mariposa De Barrio on June 27, 2017. The show follows the life story of the late singer-songwriter Jenni Rivera based on the autobiography written by Rivera "Unbreakable: My Story, My Way" before her death in 2013. Sepulveda portrayed Rivera's youngest daughter, Jenicka López Rivera, ages twelve, thirteen, fourteen, and fifteen- year-old. Press described Sepulveda's character as being "a bright, sweet girl, and beautiful from the soul...whose ingenuity allows her to delve into any subject no matter how deep it may be and win the game with a wide advantage, all while maintaining his irresistible smile." Shortly after, the series aired in the streaming platform of Netflix Latinoamérica, and on January 1, 2020, the series made its debut on, Netflix USA.

=== 2014–2022: Viral video and The "Star Spangled Banner" ===
In 2018, Sepulveda caught the attention of internet users when her video performing a cover of Selena Quintanilla's "Bidi Bidi Bom Bom", in a street in South Korea made her viral, reaching more than 3 million views to this day. Gabriela Sepulveda has been invited to perform for several notable sports teams from the San Francisco Bay Area. On September 18, 2022, Gabriela was invited to perform for the NFL at the San Francisco 49ers vs. Seattle Seahawks game at Levi's Stadium for 68,500 people in honor of Latino Heritage Month. September 13, 2014, she was asked to sing the U.S. National Anthem for the San Francisco Giants. On December 11, 2014, she was first invited to perform the Star Spangled Banner for the San Jose ice hockey team, the Sharks, and she was invited again to perform the anthem in November 2022 for Los Tiburones Night, in honor of Latino Heritage Month. She has also sang numerous times for the San Jose Earthquakes, and, in 2015, for the San Jose Barracudas.

== Singing style and notable collaborations ==
As a bilingual singer, Gabriela sings in both English as well as Spanish songs. Her biggest singing inspiration is Selena Quintanilla, prompting her to choose many of Quintanilla's songs in her concerts. Sepulveda has sung from several genres of music such as mariachi, country music, pop, ballads, blues, bachata, and soul music. She has mentioned in many interviews that she shares a close bond with her Latin American heritage and that Mariachi and Mexican ranchera style music is closest to her heart.

In July 2022, Gabriela was invited by artist Luis Coronel to perform on stage with him his hit song, "Mi Niña Traviesa" during his concert at the Stanislaus County Fair in Turlock, California. In July 2021, Sepulveda shared the stage with grammy winners Banda Los Sebastianes de Saúl Plata in Salinas, California where she performed "Ese Loco Soy Yo," a cover from Grupo Liberación with Regional Mexican singers Andrés Padilla, Javier Larrañaga, and Armando Celis. In July 2022, she was invited by artist Luis Coronel to perform on stage with him his hit song, "Mi Niña Traviesa" during his concert at the Stanislaus County Fair in Turlock, California. Sepulveda has also collaborated with Victor Hugo Santos on his album “25 Años de Canciones para Niños.” She also sang with and opera singer, Miguel Sotomayor, the songs “Vivo por Ella”, “Hoy Tengo Ganas de Ti”, and “Written in the Stars.” Sepulveda also has collaborated with the famous Spanish pop star Abraham Mateo Chamorro in the song “Un 5 de Agosto.” A song dedicated to the 33 rescued Chilean Miners from the Copiapó Mining Incident. She also performs in the annual event, Noche Bohemia, in Salinas, California. She has performed in Fiesta Gigantes de San Francisco, and participated in the Navidad en Mexico Bay Area Tour, featured alongside Ballet Folklorico de Carlos Moreno. Sepulveda also performed in the National Policy Forum on Arts Education, an event organized by the United States White House and Vivafest.

== Awards and recognitions ==
Gabriela's success has earned her the recipient of numerous awards and nominations throughout her career. Recently, she won World Artist Of The Year at the Josie Music Awards—the largest award ceremony in the independent music industry with an original song titled, "Corazon de Olvido" written by her mother and songwriter, Diana Sepulveda. In October 2022, Gabriela was also awarded at the Josie Music Awards. World Music Artist Of The Year with her original song, "De Color Rosa," cowritten by herself and Diana Sepulveda. Also in 2022, she was awarded the title, Revelación Juvenil Del Año en Regional Mexicano (Youth Revelation of Regional Mexican Music of the Year) at the prestigious Grandeza Hispana International Awards held in Mexico City in June 2022. In 2016, her song "Pero Nadie" won Song of the Year in the world category and she received the Fan's Choice Award at the Josie Music Awards. In 2022, she was recognized by the Las Vegas International Press Association with Presea Máximo Orgullo Hispano in Chicago, Illinois. Her work as a Communication and Journalism student from Santa Clara University has also been honored and recognized. Her podcast "Mindfulness Mid Pandemic" won first place in the Audio Documentary category at the national competition College Media Association Film Festival that recognizes and awards high-quality journalism

== Education and personal life ==
n June 2021, Sepulveda graduated from Santa Clara University with a double degree in Communication and Ethnic Studies. Her work as a Communication and Journalism student from Santa Clara University was nationally recognized when her podcast "Mindfulness Mid Pandemic" won first place in the Audio Documentary category at the nationally-acclaimed College Media Association Film Festival that recognizes and awards high-quality journalism Prior to graduating from college, Gabriela Sepulveda always called herself a “full-time student” in most interviews when asked on her views on education. She mentioned in one of her interviews that, “Education is the one thing that I know will always carry with me everywhere I go, but I also learn because I enjoy opening my eyes to different topics and exploring my mind along with it.” A special video of her performing "The Climb" by Miley Cyrus was played during the virtual graduation ceremony in remembrance of honor of how the Class of 2021 "will face many 'mountains'...but it’s the journey to overcome those mountains that matters most." Sepulveda has also actively voiced her support for animal rights and supports the organization PETA and has also performed numerous times for nonprofit organizations like the Children's Discovery Museum, the Monterey Bay Aquarium, and SIREN (Services, Immigrant, Refugees, Education Network). She is also the ambassador for the organization, “Juntos por la Vida”, which works to help suicidal teens and victims of abuse.

== Awards and nominations ==
Grandeza Hispana International Awards

Year	Nominee / work	Award	Result
2022	Herself	Youth Revelation of Regional Mexican Music of the Year	Won

Presea Máximo Orgullo Hispano

Year	Nominee / work	Award	Result
2022	Herself	Premio Máximo Orgullo Hispano	Won

College Media Association Film and Audio Festival

Year	Nominee / work	Award	Result
2022	Herself	Best Audio Documentary	Won

Josie Music Awards

Year	Nominee / work	Award	Result
2016	"Pero Nadie"	World Category: Song Of The Year	Won
2016	Herself	The Fan's Choice Award	Won
2022	Herself	World Music Artist of the Year	Won
