= 2026 Leagues Cup knockout stage =

Second and final stage of soccer tournament

The knockout stage of the 2026 Leagues Cup was the second and final stage of the competition, following the league phase. The knockout stage began on August 25 and concluded with the final on September 6. The top four teams from each table advanced to the knockout stage to compete in a single-elimination tournament. There were eight matches in the knockout stage, including a third-place playoff played between the two losing semifinalists.

== Format ==
The knockout stage of the 2026 Leagues Cup was contested between four teams from Liga MX and four teams from Major League Soccer (MLS). Out of all 36 teams that competed in this tournament, only eight teams advanced to the next round, four from each league. Matches in the knockout stage were played to a finish. If the score of a match was leveled at the end of 90 minutes, no extra time was played, and the match was decided by a penalty shoot-out.

== Qualified teams ==
The top four teams from each league qualified for the knockout stage.

=== Liga MX ===
Pos	Team	Pld	W	PW	PL	L	GF	GA	GD	Pts	Qualification
1	León	3	3	0	0	0	6	3	+3	9	Advance to knockout stage
2	América	3	2	0	1	0	7	3	+4	7	Advance to knockout stage
3	Toluca	3	2	0	0	1	6	2	+4	6	Advance to knockout stage
4	Monterrey	3	2	0	0	1	5	4	+1	6	Advance to knockout stage

Source: Leagues Cup

=== Major League Soccer ===
Pos	Team	Pld	W	PW	PL	L	GF	GA	GD	Pts	Qualification
1	Chicago Fire FC	3	3	0	0	0	7	2	+5	9	Advance to knockout stage
2	Austin FC	3	2	1	0	0	6	1	+5	8	Advance to knockout stage
3	Columbus Crew	3	2	1	0	0	6	3	+3	8	Advance to knockout stage
4	Real Salt Lake	3	2	0	1	0	8	1	+7	7	Advance to knockout stage

Source: Leagues Cup

== Bracket ==
The tournament bracket is shown below, with bold denoting the winners of each match.

Times are EDT (UTC−4), as listed by CONCACAF (local times, if different, are in parentheses).

Quarterfinals
August 25 – Commerce City
**(Mexico) León**	**3**
(United States) Real Salt Lake	0
August 26 – Harrison
**(Mexico) Toluca**	**2**
(United States) Austin FC	0
August 25 – Bridgeview
**(Mexico) Monterrey**	**2**
(United States) Chicago Fire FC	1
August 26 – Carson
**(Mexico) América**	**2**
(United States) Columbus Crew	0

Semifinals
September 2 – Houston
(Mexico) León	0
**(Mexico) Toluca**	**2**
September 2 – Carson
**(Mexico) Monterrey (p)**	**2 (5)**
(Mexico) América	2 (4)

Final
September 6 – Houston
**(Mexico) Toluca**	**2**
(Mexico) Monterrey	0
Third place playoff
September 6 – Houston
**(Mexico) León**	**1**
(Mexico) América	0

== Quarterfinals ==
=== Summary ===
Quarterfinals
Team 1	Score	Team 2
Monterrey (Mexico)	2–1	(United States) Chicago Fire FC
León (Mexico)	3–0	(United States) Real Salt Lake
Toluca (Mexico)	2–0	(United States) Austin FC
América (Mexico)	2–0	(United States) Columbus Crew

=== Matches ===
August 25, 2026
20:30 (19:30 UTC−5)

Monterrey (Mexico)	2–1	(United States) Chicago Fire FC
Guzmán 45+4'; Pineda 83'	Report	Zinckernagel 59'

SeatGeek Stadium, Bridgeview
Attendance: 18,131
Referee: Rubiel Vazquez (United States)

August 25, 2026
22:30 (20:30 UTC−6)

León (Mexico)	3–0	(United States) Real Salt Lake
Cambindo 21', 72'; Vegas 66'	Report

Dick's Sporting Goods Park, Commerce City
Attendance: 7,150
Referee: Steven Madrigal (Costa Rica)

August 26, 2026
20:30

Toluca (Mexico)	2–0	(United States) Austin FC
Helinho 53' (pen.); Díaz 90+7'	Report

Sports Illustrated Stadium, Harrison
Attendance: 8,110
Referee: Filip Dujic (Canada)

August 26, 2026
22:45 (19:45 UTC−7)

América (Mexico)	2–0	(United States) Columbus Crew
Veiga 11'; Rodríguez 45+6'	Report

Dignity Health Sports Park, Carson
Attendance: 20,637
Referee: Marco Ortíz (Mexico)

== Semifinals ==
=== Summary ===
Semifinals
Team 1	Score	Team 2
Toluca (Mexico)	2–0	(Mexico) León
América (Mexico)	2–2 (4–5 p)	(Mexico) Monterrey

=== Matches ===
September 2, 2026
21:00 (20:00 UTC−5)

Toluca (Mexico)	2–0	(Mexico) León
Pereira 41'; Viñas 69'	Report

Shell Energy Stadium, Houston
Referee: Saíd Martínez (Honduras)

September 2, 2026
23:30 (20:30 UTC−7)

América (Mexico)	2–2	(Mexico) Monterrey
Juárez 57'; Cervantes 63'	Report	Rossi 49'; Ocampos 69' (pen.)
Penalties
Veiga (penalty scored); Rodríguez (penalty scored); Reyes (penalty scored); Cervantes (penalty missed); Sánchez (penalty scored)	4–5	(penalty scored) Orellano; (penalty scored) Rossi; (penalty scored) Guzmán; (penalty scored) Corona; (penalty scored) Cuypers

Dignity Health Sports Park, Carson
Attendance: 21,276
Referee: Mario Escobar (Guatemala)

== Third place playoff ==
The winner of the third place match qualified for the first round of the 2027 CONCACAF Champions Cup.

=== Summary ===
Third place playoff
Team 1	Score	Team 2
León (Mexico)	1–0	(Mexico) América

=== Matches ===
September 6, 2025
18:00 (17:00 UTC−5)

León (Mexico)	1–0	(Mexico) América
Cambindo 80'	Report

Shell Energy Stadium, Houston
Attendance: 21,144
Referee: Oshane Nation (Jamaica)

== Final ==
Both clubs that made the final qualified for 2027 CONCACAF Champions Cup, with the winner qualify directly to the round of 16.

Final
Team 1	Score	Team 2
Toluca (Mexico)	2–0	(Mexico) Monterrey
