= Therese May =

American artist (born 1943)

Therese May (born 1943 in Madison, Wisconsin) is an American artist who was an early participants in the art quilt movement that began in the 1960s. She is known for her mixed media quilts and is featured in several contemporary quilting histories.

== Early life and education ==
May was born August 5, 1943, in Madison, Wisconsin. She began to self-identify as an artist while in kindergarten. She studied painting at the University of Wisconsin, earning a bachelor's degree in Art in 1967. In 1974 she earned a Master of Fine Arts degree from San Jose State University. She continues to live and work in San Jose in her home studio.

== Early career ==
May began to piece quilts in the late 1960s. Initially, her quilts were made of squares and triangles. However, she soon developed a method which involved projecting a photographic slide on to paper and then tracing the image. The drawing was then cut out and used as a pattern for fabric. May entered a quilt that was made using this method (Therese Quilt) in a mixed craft media exhibition at the Walnut Creek Civic Art Center in 1969: Animals, Quilts, and Blunt Instruments. She won a prize and realized that a career as a fiber artist was possible.

Jean Ray Laury, who is "regarded by many as the leading voice in the early sixties quilt revival," saw Therese Quilt and included it in her book, Quilts and Coverlets: A Contemporary Approach (1970). Quilts and Coverlets is considered to be the first major book on contemporary quiltmaking, and it became widely influential among fiber artists. Inclusion in this book launched May's career.

Therese Quilt (1969) features an image of May's face that was reproduced eighty times and traced onto eighty different fabrics. Each tracing was then cut identically into pieces and reassembled like a miniature jigsaw puzzle so that each portrait is composed of different fabrics and no two blocks are the same. The portraits were then machine appliquéd to a backing fabric. The fabrics, which were obtained from used clothing that was purchased in thrift shops, "zing and clash, rather than coordinate." In describing the quilt, Laury wrote, "The pattern of hexagonal shapes is so reminiscent of old quilts that it is a delightful jolt to have the faces emerge from the pattern." May stated that these self-portraits reflect human nature in that, "We are the same person and yet we are never the same. With each passing hour we are slightly different." Therese Quilt was later selected as one of the "Twentieth Century's Best American Quilts" by a panel that included representatives of The Alliance for American Quilts, The American Quilt Study Group, The International Quilt Association, International Quilt Festival, and PRIMEDIA Special Interest Publications.

Bridget Quilt (1968) was also included in Quilts and Coverlets. It, too, featured a repeated image, with each repetition composed of different fabrics. Laury described it as combining "the elements of a traditional quilt with the photographic image approach of contemporary painting."

During the 1970s, "May's subject matter focused on domestic scenes, her children, and her collection of salt and pepper shakers." She also incorporated patterns from Early American hooked and braided rugs in her paintings, drawings, and quilts.

== Later career ==
In 1977, May began drawing and painting fantasy animals. These images began to appear in her quilts in 1981. She was inspired by artists such as Joan Brown, Roy De Forest, and David Gilhooly. Around 1980 she began painting directly on her quilts, creating "thick, often crusty, surfaces of layered color and texture." May enjoys the risk of adding paint, stating, "Adding paint can either make or break the work. You can lose a lot of time if the paint you add doesn't work." In addition to paint, she often embellishes her quilts with embroidery and will intentionally leave some or all of the threads dangling to "add another layer of texture, color, and tactile interest" to the quilt's surface. She often adds buttons and beads. May states that, "An embellished quilt has the feeling of a collection." Her work has influenced the use of embellishment in quilts, which she encourages in the workshops that she teaches.

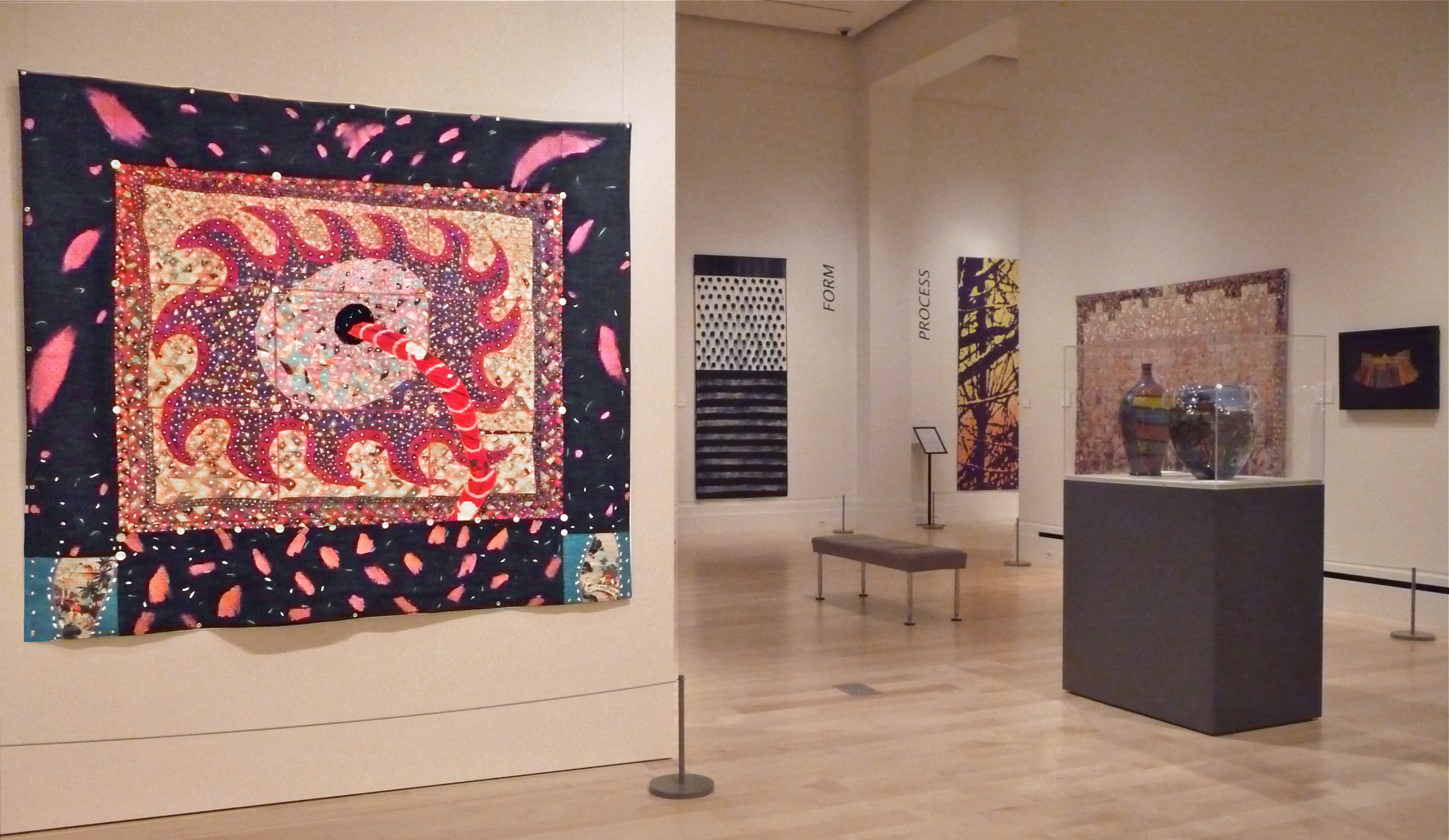
An installation view of the 2009 exhibition at the International Quilt Study Center & Museum, Lincoln, Nebraska, featuring the 1985 art quilt "Sawblade" (left) by Therese May.

May continued to exhibit regularly, sell her work, and teach, and by the late 1980s she was working full-time as a professional artist. Two of her pieces, Thy Will Be Done (1985) and For All The World To See (1984), were included in The Art Quilt, an exhibition featuring the work of non-traditional quilters which opened at the Los Angeles Municipal Art Gallery in 1986, and then traveled to seven other sites over a three-year period. Robert Shaw wrote, "As the first major curated exhibit of its kind, The Art Quilt defined the cutting edge of the new movement and identified its leading practitioners." During this period May also created Fish and Chicks (1986), a "personal visual narrative" that is full of symbolism.

One of May's later works is Pregnant Winter Tree (1993), a machine appliquéd piece which is also painted, beaded, and further embellished with buttons. Robert Shaw describes it as "dreamlike and open to interpretation." Referring to it, May noted, "Much of the time there is so much more to the world than is apparent. In the creative process sometimes we think nothing is happening, but actually lots is happening. When things don't seem to be growing, they really are."

May's other later works include Cup-O-Wurms (1995) and a piece commissioned for the San Jose Convention Center in 1993. In 1997, Robert Shaw described her as "one of the most visible and highly regarded quilt artists for many years."
