= Arthur Atkins (painter) =

American painter (1873–1899)

Arthur Atkins (1873, Queens Ferry, England - 1899, Piedmont, California) was an American tonalist landscape painter. He emigrated to San Francisco at the age of 19. He was essentially self-taught, although he briefly studied at the San Francisco School of Design. His paintings were shown at the Vickery, Atkins & Torrey gallery and at his Jackson Street studio, both in San Francisco, and his paintings sold well. His brother, Henry Atkins and his uncle, William Kingston Vickery were co-founders of the Vickery, Atkins & Torrey art gallery.

Between 1897 and August 1898, Atkins visited England and France, where he studied art in Paris. He was mostly influenced by the paintings of Édouard Manet and James McNeill Whistler while in Europe.

Atkins' favorite landscape subject were the rolling hills near Piedmont, across the bay from San Francisco. Atkins' works are very rare due to a fire at his San Francisco studio in the 1890s and further losses in the 1906 San Francisco earthquake and fire.

A book of Atkins' notes and letters, from his visit to Europe, by A. M. Robertson and Bruce Porter, was published in 1908.

== Works ==
- Piedmont Valley (1895)
- Piedmont Hills (1896)
- Landscape (1896)
- Piedmont (1896)
- Pines: St. Hospice (1897)
- The Marne: Charenton (1898)
- The Basin: St. Cloud (1898)
- Charenton (1898)
- Penarth Pier (1898)
