= Katherine Agnes Chandler =

- Born: May 1865; San Francisco, California, United States
- Died: June 24, 1930 (aged 65); Los Gatos, California, United States
- Resting place: Holy Cross Cemetery, Colma, California
- Occupations: Botanist, writer, librarian
- Known for: "The Wildflower Lady of California"
- Notable work: Habits of California Plants (1903), As California wild flowers grow (1922), In the reign of Coyote (1905), The Bird-Woman of the Lewis and Clark Expedition
- Parent(s): William Sylvester Chandler, Catherine Agnes Comerford
- Relatives: Albert E. Chandler (brother), William Sylvester Chandler (brother), Joseph Francis Chandler (brother), George E. Chandler (brother), Mabel G. Chandler (sister)

Katherine Agnes Chandler (May 1865 – June 24, 1930) was a botanist and writer, known as "The Wildflower Lady of California".

== Biography ==
Katherine Agnes Chandler was born in San Francisco in 1865, the daughter of William Sylvester Chandler (1829–1898), of London, and Catherine Agnes Comerford (1847–1912). She had four brothers, Albert E. Chandler, William Sylvester Chandler (1867–1913), Joseph Francis Chandler (1869–1959), and George E. Chandler (1879–1887) and one sister, Mabel G. Chandler (1875-1958).

She was a librarian associated with the Pacific Northwest and California (she contributed articles for the San Francisco Chronicle); she published books for 2nd and 3rd grade schoolchildren about California wildflowers (Habits of California Plants, 1903, and As California wild flowers grow: suggestions to nature lovers, 1922), Native folktales (In the reign of Coyote: folklore from the Pacific coast, 1905), Sacagawea (The Bird-Woman of the Lewis and Clark Expedition), and William Clark's servant York.

The Garden of Shakespearean Flowers in Golden Gate Park was originated by Alice Eastwood and carried out by Chandler. In 1903 Chandler credited Eastwood in her Habits of California Plants.

Another of her ventures was The Deer Park Springs Hotel, near Lake Tahoe, constructed by John Brown Scott in 1880 who sold it to Chandler in 1905. She added tennis and croquet grounds to the resort. In 1908 Chandler recut the trail from Deer Park into the famous Hell Hole, a trail that had been lost for many years. In 1909 Emily Williams remodeled Deer Park Inn for Chandler. Emily probably met Chandler in Pacific Grove, California, where Chandler frequently rented a cottage. Both women were friends of Etta Belle Lloyd, a Pacific Grove businesswoman who ran an insurance agency and managed several commercial properties that had been owned by her father David.

In 1905, Chandler compiled, for the Library Association of California, a list of California periodicals issued before the 1861 completion of the transcontinental telegraph.

Katherine Chandler died in 1930 in Los Gatos, California, and is buried at Holy Cross Cemetery, Colma.
