= Lucy Washburn =

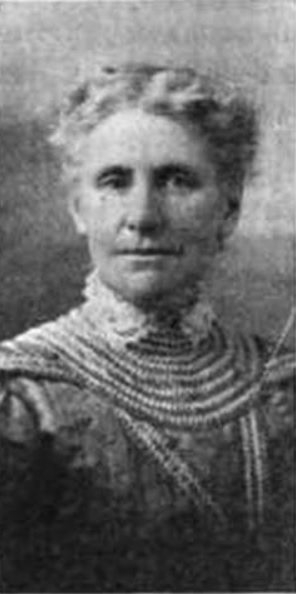
- Lucy M. Washburn
- Born: April 23, 1848; Fredonia, New York, US
- Died: September 26, 1939 (aged 91); Porterville, California, US
- Education: Fredonia Academy, Vassar College, Cornell University
- Years active: 1873 – 1920
- Known for: Educational pioneer in Santa Clara County, California

Lucy M. Washburn (April 23, 1848 – September 26, 1939) was a high school education pioneer in the San Francisco Bay Area and one of the founders of the San Jose State Normal School.

== Early life ==
Lucy Washburn was born on April 23, 1848, in Fredonia, New York, south of Lake Erie. She was the daughter of a regimental surgeon with the Union forces who died during the Civil War. She had a younger brother, Arthur H. Washburn, a mechanical engineer and on the faculty of the San Jose State Normal School with her.

She attended the Fredonia Academy, last student to graduate in 1867 before the academy was closed. It reopened as one of four state normal schools with a focus on training future teachers. The transition was supported by Washburn. After Fredonia, Washburn attended also Vassar College and Cornell University.

== Career ==
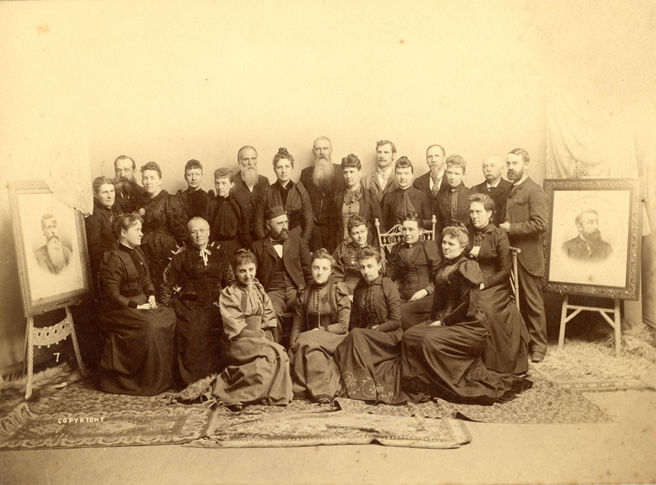
Lucy Washburn, standing, far left, SJSU Special Collections and Archives

Washburn taught in New York and Virginia before moving to the Santa Clara Valley in 1870. There she lived with her mother at the house of her uncle, Dr. Elliott Reed.

In 1873, Washburn joined the faculty of the newly founded San Jose State Normal School (previously the State Normal School was located in San Francisco). At first she was a mathematics teacher and assistant principal to Charles H. Allen. Later Washburn specialized in history, physiology and zoology.

In 1888, her brother Arthur married Jessica Benton Thompson, another teacher at San Jose State Normal School. In 1894 Arthur and Jessica Washburn opened the Washburn Preparatory School, and Lucy helped them starting off the school. Washburn School helped students preparing to enter Stanford University, University of California, Berkeley and other elite colleges.

Washburn continued to teach at the San Jose State Normal School until retirement in 1900, but returned in 1914, at the start of the World War I. She retired definitely in 1920, at the age of 72.

== Personal life ==
In early 1908 Washburn sold a property on 218 and 220 Chestnut, Pacific Grove, to Emily Williams to build two houses, for Williams and her partner, Lillian McNeill Palmer. Williams was a former student at the San Jose Normal School, together with Etta Belle Lloyd, who was Williams' supporter and a prominent civic figure in Pacific Grove. In 1910 Washburn moved to a house at 215 Alder, Pacific Grove.

In 1921, at the death of her brother, Lucy and Jessica Washburn moved to Los Gatos. After a fire destroyed the Los Gatos home in April 1939, Lucy Washburn spent her last year in Hermosa Beach. She was visiting her nephew in Porterville, when she died on September 26, 1939, at the age of 91.

== Legacy ==
The red brick dorms at San Jose State University are named after Lucy M. Washburn, known as "Aunt Lucy" to many of her students when the buildings were part of the San Jose Normal School.
