= Francis McComas =

Francis McComas may refer to:

- Francis McComas (painter) (1875–1938), Tasmanian-born landscape artist
- J. Francis McComas (1911–1978), American science fiction editor
