= Al Gould =

American baseball player (1893–1982)

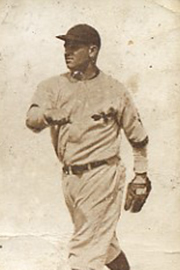
- Pitcher
- Born: January 20, 1893; Muscatine, Iowa, U.S.
- Died: August 8, 1982 (aged 89); San Jose, California, U.S.
- Batted: Right Threw: Right

MLB debut
- July 11, 1916, for the Cleveland Indians

Last MLB appearance
- August 18, 1917, for the Cleveland Indians

MLB statistics
- Win–loss record: 9–11
- Games pitched: 57
- Shutouts: 1
- Stats at Baseball Reference

Teams
- Cleveland Indians (1916–1917)

Career highlights and awards
- On August 2, 1916, he pitched a shutout against the Philadelphia Athletics.

Albert Frank "Al" Gould (January 20, 1893 – August 8, 1982), also known as "Pudgy", was an American Major League Baseball player who pitched two seasons for the Cleveland Indians of the American League. Born in Muscatine, Iowa, he was 5 feet 6 inches (1.68 m) in height and weighed 160 pounds (73 kg).

== Major League career ==
Gould made his major league debut on July 11, 1916, for the Cleveland Indians. He pitched a shutout on August 2, 1916 against the Philadelphia Athletics. He finished the season with a 5-6 record and a 2.53 earned run average (ERA) in 30 games. The following season, he spent the year with the Indians and played in 27 games, going 4-4 with a 3.64 ERA. He returned to the minor leagues after that season.

== Minor League career ==
Gould enjoyed a long career in the minors, mainly playing in the Pacific Coast League (PCL). His 14 seasons in the PCL produced a win–loss record of 127–134, an earned run average of 4.43, highlighted by leading the league in winning percentage in 1927. A very good fielder in both the minors and the majors, he twice led the PCL at his position in fielding percentage. Another highlight of his PCL career took place in 1919, when he pitched two complete game victories in one doubleheader. Most of his minor league success game with the Salt Lake City Bees. With them, he had 71 wins in five seasons between 1919 and 1923.

== Post-career ==
Gould died on August 8, 1982, at the age of 89 in San Jose, California, and was cremated and interred at Los Gatos Memorial Park in San Jose.
