= Los Gatos Memorial Park =

Cemetery in Los Gatos, California, US

- Interactive map of Los Gatos Memorial Park

Details
- Established: 1889
- Location: San Jose, California
- Country: United States
- Coordinates: 37°14′40″N 121°56′29″W

Los Gatos Memorial Park is the principal cemetery of Los Gatos, California, established in 1889. It occupies some thirty acres, with the main entrance at 2255 Los Gatos-Almaden Road, San Jose, California 95124.

By the late 1880s, Los Gatos needed a cemetery, and the matter was considered by the Odd Fellows Lodge. As a result, on December 9, 1889, some members of the lodge formed the Los Gatos Cemetery Association, with J. H. Lyndon as president, and it went on to acquire land and establish a burial ground which was at first known as the Los Gatos Cemetery.

In 1901, the cemetery was advertised as "2½ miles E on Almaden rd", with offices in Los Gatos at Main near Railroad Avenue.

By 1997, the Los Gatos Cemetery had been renamed as a Memorial Park and had also been taken into its city limits by the San Jose City Council.

== Notable memorials ==
- John Beecher (1904–1980), poet and journalist
- James F. Boccardo (1911–2003), lawyer and philanthropist
- Sidney Dolores Bunce (1892–1965), British-born portrait artist
- Al Gould (1893–1982), Major League baseball player
- Steve Harwell (1967–2023), lead singer of the band Smash Mouth
- Bill Hewlett (1913–2001), co-founder of the Hewlett-Packard Company
- Clark Hobart (1868–1948), painter
- Alan Passaro, killer of Meredith Hunter Jr. (died 1985)
- Jason Jurman (1979–2014), actor
- Alice MacGowan (1858–1947), writer
- Fremont Older (1856–1935), newspaperman and editor
- Lillian McNeill Palmer (1871–1961), Arts and Crafts metalsmith
- Nathan Rosenberg (1927–2015), economist
- Emily Eolian Williams (1869–1942), architect
- Katka Zupančič (1889–1967), Slovene-American author and teacher
- Duong Trong Lam (died 1981), an assassinated Vietnamese journalist, was briefly buried at the cemetery in 1981, but his remains were removed by his father after anti-communist protests by the Vietnamese community.
- Maryam Mirzakhani (1977–2017), mathematician
