= Henry Atkins (designer) =

American interior designer (1867–1923)

John Henry Paul Atkins (July 13, 1867 – November 25, 1923) was an Irish-American designer who cofounded the San Francisco, California art gallery Vickery, Atkins & Torrey.

== Early life ==
Henry Atkins was born in Skibbereen, County Cork, Ireland, one of nine children born to a corn trader from Belfast and his Corkonian wife. The family left Cork in 1869 to move to Egremont in Cheshire, England. The family moved again in 1878 to nearby Liverpool with its greater Irish population. Henry himself left home just a few years later. He arrived in the San Francisco Bay Area in 1888, shortly before his 21st birthday. His brother, Arthur, joined him briefly in 1892 before going to study painting in Paris. Arthur returned with David, another brother, in 1898 but died in January 1899 having established his name as a noted California painter. David became an assayer in Sonora before starting an import-export firm.

Henry married Daisy Howard, and took her to England in 1900. They returned with two more family members, Elsie and Ernest. Ernest stayed for only eighteen months, returning to England in 1901 for Christmas with the family. He then took a position in Port Said, Egypt for three years, and returned to California in February, 1905. Another brother and sister, Herbert and Avesia, arrived in California in July, 1906. The remainder of the family, including the parents, Georgina and Henry, and the eldest girl, Marion, arrived in 1908.

== Work ==
He co-founded the art gallery at 236 Post Street, San Francisco with his uncle William Kingston Vickery as soon as he arrived in the Bay area in 1888. Frederic Cheever Torrey joined them a few years later. The business suffered little damage in the 1906 earthquake and they later opened a branch at 550 Sutter Street. From its initial focus on art dealing the business expanded to include art supplies, picture framing, interior design, and decorating.

Atkins designed furniture, fireplace equipment, candlesticks, urns and screens, shop windows, jewelry, garden gates, clocks, crosses, dishes, trays, chests, screens, frames and chandeliers. He also designed complete interiors, including the main reading room of the Doe Memorial Library at the University of California, Berkeley.

He also designed the concrete staircases at Bancroft Steps and Orchard Lane (1910) at the foot of Panoramic Hill in Berkeley, California.
