= John Beecher (poet) =

American poet

John Beecher (January 22, 1904 – May 11, 1980) was an activist poet, writer, and journalist who wrote about the Southern United States during the Great Depression and the American Civil Rights Movement. Beecher was active in the American labor and civil rights movements. During the McCarthy era, Beecher lost his teaching job for refusing to sign a state loyalty oath. Following a 1967 decision of the California Supreme Court that disallowed such a loyalty oath, he was reinstated in 1977. Beecher's books include Report to the Stockholders, To Live and Die in Dixie, and In Egypt Land.

== Biography ==
John Henry Newman Beecher was born in New York City on January 22, 1904, to Leonard and Isabel Beecher. He was a descendant of the New England literary and abolitionist Beechers that included Harriet Beecher Stowe, the author of Uncle Tom's Cabin, Lyman Beecher, and Henry Ward Beecher. His father was a steel industry executive. In 1907, Beecher's father was transferred to Birmingham, Alabama, to work for the United States Steel Corporation and Beecher spent the rest of his childhood in the American South.

Beecher's family intended their son to become an executive like his father. After graduating from public high school at age fourteen, Beecher went to work in the steel mills of the Tennessee Coal, Iron and Railroad Company. The labor abuses he saw there caused him to become active in labor movement issues. He also wrote several of the radical activist poems he eventually became known for. He spent only a short time at the Virginia Military Institute before he found the school's hazing of new cadets a reason to leave. Beecher attended several colleges and earned his BA from the University of Alabama in 1924. He was severely injured while working on the construction of the Fairfield Sheet Mill near Birmingham in 1925.

Beecher earned a master's degree in English at the University of Wisconsin in 1929 while teaching at Alexander Meiklejohn's experimental college there. He then pursued graduate studies in sociology at the University of North Carolina, where he worked on Howard Washington Odum's Southern Regions of the United States (1936). He published Report to the Stockholders in 1933, a nine-part poem about the unfair treatment of mill workers. From 1934 to 1941, he worked for the Federal Emergency Relief Administration and other New Deal programs in the South and Southwest. His varied activities included managing resettlement camps for displaced farmers, both white and black. He published his first work of sociology in 1935, an article in the journal Social Forces about a biracial union in Notasulga, Alabama. He described his frustration with the government's programs in two collections of poems: Here I Stand (1940) and And I Will Be Heard (1941).

During World War II, he volunteered and served as a commissioned officer of the interracial crew of the troop transport SS Booker T. Washington and wrote a book about his experiences, All Brave Sailors. Reviewing it in the New Republic, Ralph Ellison wrote that it provided "a heartwarming but somewhat sentimentalized picture" that excluded even the healthy amount of interracial conflict that could be expected. "Despite their high political consciousness," he wrote, "for a mixed group of Americans a-sail on the rough seas of our race relations, Beecher's seamen encountered an embarrassment of fine weather." He thought Beecher's portrait of his family background showed the promise of "a really important autobiography". After the war, he was commissioned to write a history of Minnesota's politicians and the farmer-labor movement in the 1930s. It was not published until 1980 when it appeared as Tomorrow is a Day.

Beecher took a teaching position at San Francisco State College in 1948. In 1950, he refused to sign the loyalty oath required by California's Levering Act. He was fired from his teaching job for "gross unprofessional conduct" and blacklisted from teaching. He described the experience in an essay in The Nation: "California: There She Goes". During the 1950s, Beecher worked as a rancher and printer. He produced privately printed editions and broadsides of his own poetry at his own Morning Star Press. He also taught at Arizona State University in the late 1950s.

Beecher spent the 1960s primarily as a journalist writing about social injustice, and also as a teacher, while enjoying the renewed prominence of his poetry. As a writer and journalist, he contributed to publications such as The Nation, Ramparts, the San Francisco Chronicle, and the New York Times. In 1968, a recording of him reading several of his poems was released under the title "John Beecher's To Live and Die in Dixie". A New York Times reviewer commented: "John Beecher's complaints are specific: injustices against the Negro, against labor, against the newly arrived in this country. His work is hard to tell from prose, but it has a certain artlessness that is affecting in spite of the excessive simplicity of his lines." In 1970, Studs Terkel included Beecher as one of his subjects in Hard Times: An Oral History of the Great Depression.

In 1967, the California Supreme Court found the Levering Act unconstitutional. In 1977, Beecher's dismissal from his teaching post was overturned and he was reappointed.

Beecher taught full-time at San Francisco State until August 1979. His classes included Sociology, Writing, Humanities, and American Literature.

Beecher married several times. He wed Virginia St. Clair Donovan in 1926. They had four children and later divorced. He was married twice briefly between 1946, which produced a son Tom, and 1952 and married his fourth wife, Barbara, in 1955.

John Beecher died of lung disease on May 11, 1980, and was buried in Los Gatos Memorial Park in San Jose, California.

== Selected publications ==
Poetry

- Here I Stand, Twice A Year Press, 1940
- And I Will Be Heard: Two Talks to the American People, Twice A Year Press, 1941
- Land of the Free, Morning Star Press, 1956
- In Egypt Land, Rampart Press, 1960
- Phantom City, Rampart Press, 1961
- Report to the Stockholders & Other Poems, Rampart Press, 1962
- Undesirables, Goosetree Press, 1964
- To Live & Die in Dixie & Other Poems, Monthly Review Press, 1966
- Hear the Wind Blow: Poems of Protest & Prophecy, International Publishers, 1968
- Collected Poems, 1924-1974, MacMillan, 1974
- One More River to Cross: Selected Poems, foreword by Studs Terkel, edited by Steven Ford Brown, NewSouth Books, 2003

Nonfiction

- All Brave Sailors: The Story of the S.S. Booker T. Washington, L.B. Fischer, 1945
- Tomorrow is a Day: A Story of the People in Politics, Vanguard Press, 1980
- Like it Be's in Leesville; Deep in the Heart of Texas, Workers Press, 1980

== Sources ==
- Dickson, Foster J. The Life and Poetry of John Beecher (1904-1980): Advocate of Poetry as a Spoken Art (Edwin Mellen Press, 2009), ISBN 978-0-7734-4654-0
- Merideth, Robert. "Homage to a Subversive: Notes Toward Explaining John Beecher", American Poetry Review, v. 5.3 (1976), 45–46
- Smith, Angela J. Here I Stand: The Life and Legacy of John Beecher. University Alabama Press, 2017.

ISBN 978-0-8173-1954-0
