= William Kingston Vickery =

Irish art dealer (1851–1925)

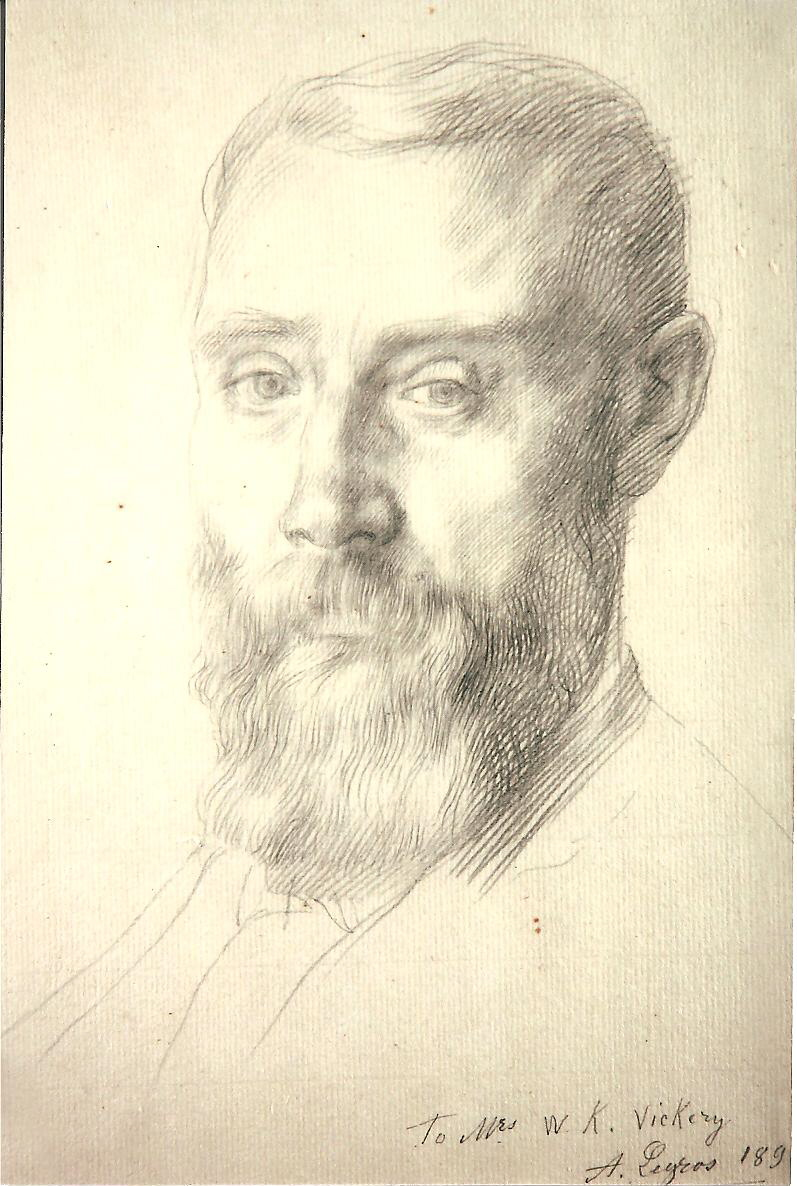
- Portrait of William Vickery at age 40 by Alphonse Legros.
- Born: 16 March 1851; Ballydehob, County Cork, Ireland
- Died: 25 March 1925 (aged 74)
- Occupation: Art dealer
- Relatives: Anne Hadden (niece)

William Kingston Vickery (16 March 1851 – 25 March 1925) was an Irish-American picture dealer who founded the San Francisco interior design firm and art gallery of Vickery, Atkins & Torrey. His art exhibitions are credited with bringing French Impressionism to the attention of Californians.

== Early life ==
William was born 16 March 1851, Ballydehob, County Cork, Ireland to Paul and Mary Anne Levis Vickery. Paul Vickery died young and Mary Anne supported the family by successfully running the family store in Skibbereen. Paul and Mary Anne had ten children.

- Samuel emigrated to Australia
- Minnie (Waters) stayed in County Cork
- Sarah Ellen (Burrowes) also emigrated to Australia, married Robert Burrowes, M.L.A. Bendigo
- Elizabeth (Hadden) moved to Piedmont, California next door to the William Vickerys
- Frances (Keppel) emigrated to New York with her husband Fred Keppel
- Avesia died at 17
- Georgiana (Atkins) married Henry Atkins. Their son, also named Henry Atkins, became a partner in Vickery, Atkins & Torrey. Henry Atkins (the son) eventually moved to Piedmont just down the street from William and Elizabeth
- George stayed in Southern Ireland
- John moved to London (his son Philip was knighted)
- William moved to California, ending up in Piedmont, on Kingston Avenue.

William went to school in Skibbereen and subsequently to the Blue Coat School (known more formally as The King's Hospital) in Dublin. When he finished school he went to work for a Dublin bank. The bank sent him to the West Indies to check on various accounts. While there, he made a trip to northern South America. He went by dugout canoe up the Essequibo River. Later, a San Francisco newspaper referred to him as "the adventuresome Mr. Vickery".

When he came down with tuberculosis, the family sent him to California to get well (or die). He travelled by way of New York where his brother-in-law Fred Keppel had a well-known art store. Fred Keppel dealt primarily in etchings as he was color blind. He gave William a consignment of etchings to sell, if he could, in San Francisco. William did not take the recently completed transcontinental railroad, but went by ship to Nicaragua, portaged across to the Pacific, and continued by ship to San Francisco. In 1880, he was living in San Rafael, Marin County, where he was able to follow doctor's orders to lead an outdoor life of activities such as horseback riding.

== Family ==
After establishing himself in California and regaining his health, William wrote to his sweetheart, Sarah Keppel (1852–1917), in Ireland, "come marry me". They had 3 children:

- Frederick Paul Vickery (1879–1965) Professor of Geology at U.C.L.A. and Sacramento State and later Director of the Crocker Art Gallery, Sacramento, and the San Francisco Art Center at Montalvo, Saratoga.
- Ruth Vickery Moser (1884–1936) housewife active in civic affairs in Cupertino California.
- Robert Kingston Vickery (1890–1971) entomologist and builder in Berkeley. He married Ruth Bacon (1893–1983), a niece of Lucy Bacon, an early California impressionist painter who had studied under Pizarro in France.

== Vickery, Atkins & Torrey ==
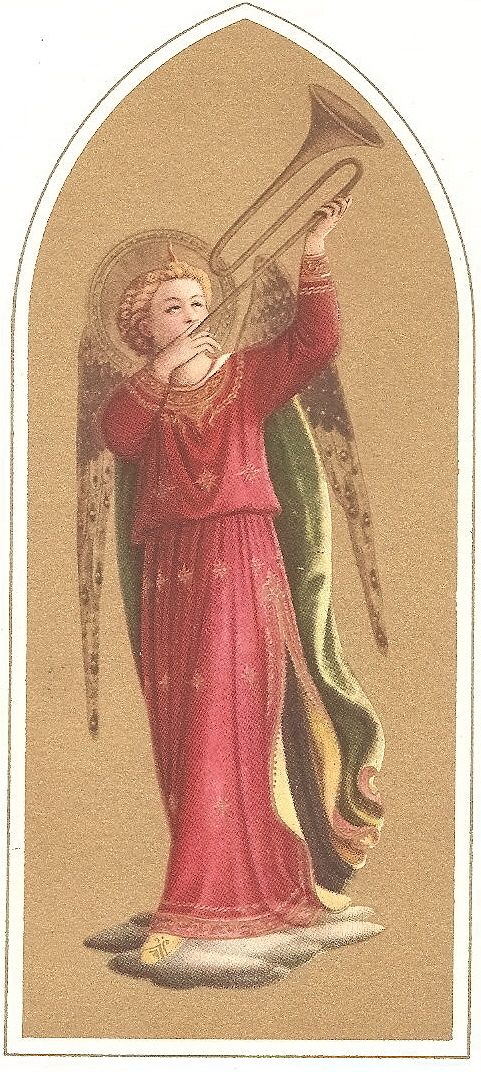
Christmas Card – one of the first sold in San Francisco

William began his art business by opening a little kiosk against the wall of the Palace Hotel on Market Street in San Francisco. As the business became established and grew, his nephew Henry Atkins joined in 1888 and Frederic Cheever Torrey (1864–1935) approximately in 1891. In 1900 the company became Vickery, Atkins & Torrey.

In March 1891, and again in 1893 and 1895, William Vickery supervised a series of loan exhibitions that introduced Impressionism to California. These exhibitions included paintings by Monet, Eugene Boudin, Camille Pissarro, Pierre Renoir, and Edgar Degas.

Vickery, Atkins & Torrey survived both the Panic of 1893 and the 1906 San Francisco earthquake, due in part to the resourcefulness of William Vickery.

In the Panic of 1893, people were just not buying fine art for Christmas presents. Vickery suggested to his customers, "why not remember them with a lovely Christmas card?" He got his Haddan nieces (who lived next door) to mount up as Christmas cards a large collection of post cards from the Museo San Marco of Florence, Italy. The cards were of Fra Angelico angels in gorgeous color. These were the first Christmas cards in San Francisco.

When the 1906 San Francisco earthquake and fire hit, the store was at 236 Post Street. His youngest son, Robert, recounted rushing with his father to San Francisco and the store. General Funston of the Presidio sent a wagon to help save the store's treasures. While the store survived the earthquake, it was dynamited to help stop the great fire. The store relocated temporarily to 1744 California Street. The new store was at 550 Sutter Street.

== Retirement ==
After retiring from the business in 1912, William and Sarah moved from their home on Kingston Avenue in Piedmont, California to Saratoga, California. They had bought 10 acres in the foothills of the Santa Clara Valley from an Edinburgh, Scotland land company that had purchased the area from the original Mexican land grantees. They lived in a house built for them by their son Robert.

William died in Saratoga on 25 March 1925.
