= Anne Hadden =

American librarian

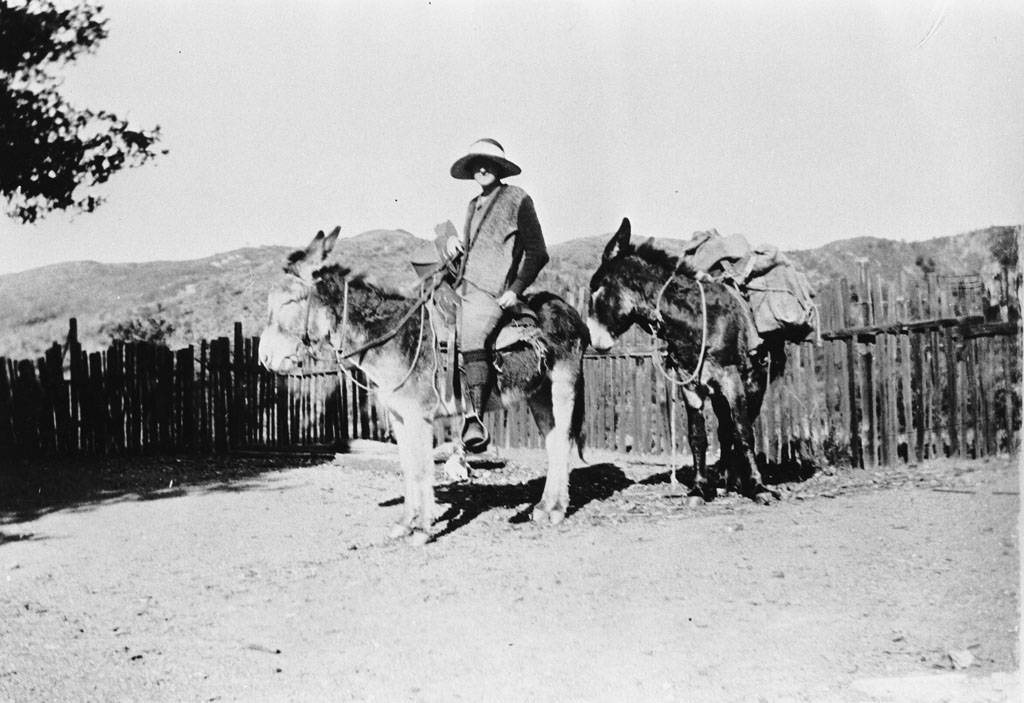
- Anne Hadden on a burro, with a second burro loaded with books, in 1916
- Born: August 16, 1874; Bandon, County Cork, Ireland
- Died: August 30, 1963 (aged 89); Pacific Grove, California
- Occupation: Librarian
- Relatives: William Kingston Vickery (uncle)

Mary Anne Hadden (August 16, 1874 – August 30, 1963) was an Irish-born American librarian. As the first director of the Monterey County Free Library, hired in 1913, Hadden established 126 branches of the library system, some of them housed in schools or private homes.

== Early life and education ==
Hadden was born in Bandon, County Cork, the daughter of David Henry Hadden and Elizabeth Vickery Hadden. Her father was a physician. She moved to the United States as a teenager in 1891, emigrating with her widowed mother and her five siblings. They settled in the San Francisco Bay area, where Hadden's uncle, William Kingston Vickery, was a noted art dealer. She graduated from Oakland High School in 1894, and, like most of her siblings, attended Stanford University, though she may not have completed a degree program there. She did complete a summer certificate course at the University of California's library school.

== Career ==
In 1899, Hadden began working at the Palo Alto Public Library. As the first director of the Monterey County Free Library, hired in 1913, Hadden established 126 branches of the library system, some of them housed in schools or private homes. She left that position after 16 years, in 1929, and was a librarian at the Palo Alto Public Library and at Modoc County Library in her later years. She was a district president of the California Library Association. She acquired and delivered books and maps, sometimes hiking or riding a horse or mule to remote locations, and encouraged local history collections at county branches, because she believed that helped integrate the library into the community. She retired from library work in 1946.

Hadden made literary contacts in the arts colony at Carmel-by-the-Sea, including writers Lincoln Steffens, Robinson Jeffers, and Mary Hunter Austin. She also knew John Steinbeck, who was a child in Salinas when she was based there. She was especially close to Irish writer Ella Young.

== Personal life and legacy ==
Hadden died in 1963, at the age of 89, in Pacific Grove. Her sister Ellen Hadden (1877-1949) owned a house on 1353 Arena Avenue in Pacific Grove (The Brown House) which she built about 1922. This cottage was one lot away from the beach in Pacific Grove, California. The embroidery studio was in a separate little cottage (The Pink House) along with a doll house. Some of Ellen's embroidery was displayed during the San Francisco Pan American Exposition in 1915. Anne Hadden lived in Pacific Grove after her retirement. After her sister's death in 1949 Anne Hadden lived in Forest Hills Manor. Her papers are at Stanford University Library. Hadden's work in Monterey County was the inspiration for a children's book, Eight Mules from Monterey (1982, 1993), by Patricia Beatty. A biography based on Hadden's unpublished writings, Books for All: Monterey County’s First Librarian, was published in 2013, edited by her grand-niece, Barbara Ann Hadden.
