= Arthur Monroe Free House =

Historic house in California, United States

- U.S. National Register of Historic Places
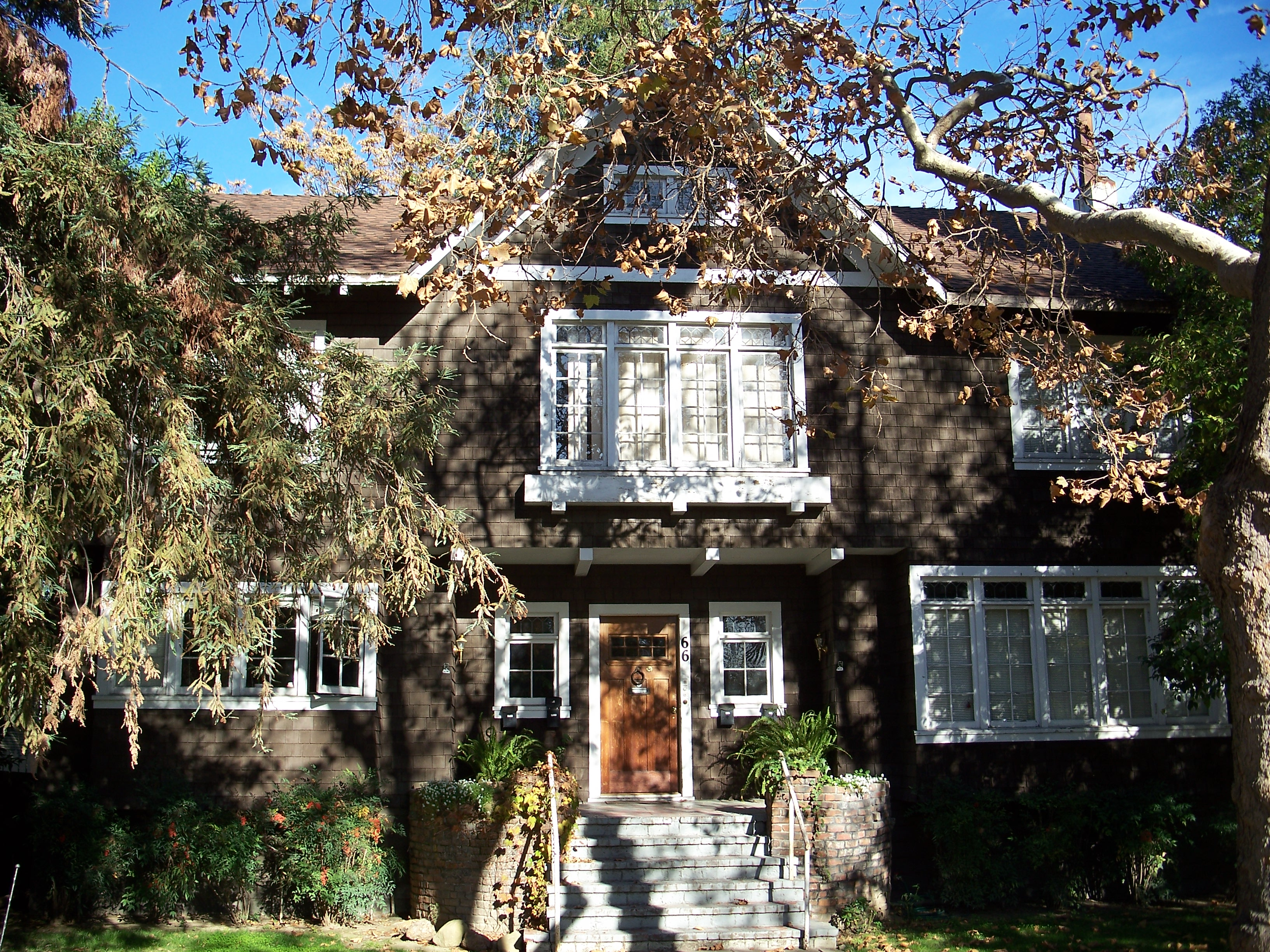

- Location within California Location within the United States
- Location: 66 S. 14th St., San Jose, California
- Coordinates: 37°20′32″N 121°52′31″W
- Area: less than one acre
- Architectural style: Craftsman
- NRHP reference No.: 02000384
- Added to NRHP: April 26, 2002

The Arthur Monroe Free House in San Jose, California is a Craftsman-style how which was listed on the National Register of Historic Places in 2002. It is located at 66 South 14th Street, which previously was 66 South Priest Street.

The house was listed on the National Register for its association with Arthur Monroe Free, a United States Congressman. Free lived at the house from 1919 until his death in 1953.

However, Donald and Annie Palmer had commissioned the house in 1905 from residential designer, Emily Williams, their "adopted" daughter and partner of their daughter, Lillian McNeill Palmer. The Palmers lived there until they moved to San Francisco around 1909. Lillian Palmer had a workshop in the basement where she practiced her metal art. Emily and Lillian lived in this house on and off.
