= Lawrence Buck =

American architect

Lawrence Buck (1865—1929) was an American architect, artist and landscape painter, associated with the Prairie School and the American Arts and Crafts Movement.

== Early years and education ==
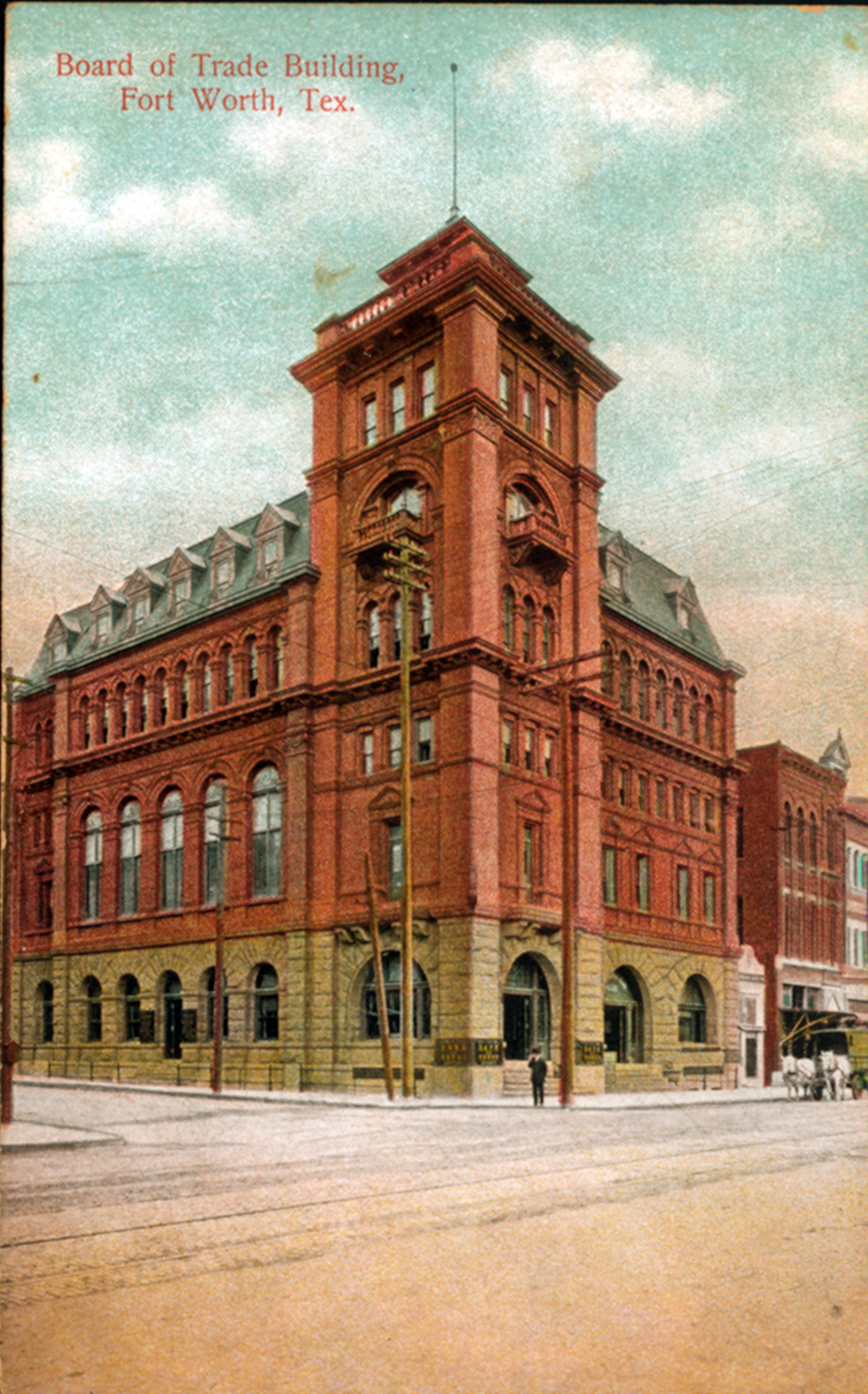
Postcard of the Board of Trade Building in Fort Worth, 1909

Lawrence H. Buck was born in 1865 in New Orleans, Louisiana. His father was William Henry Buck (1840 in Norway – 1888 in New Orleans). The elder Buck was a landscape artist, specializing in sub-tropical landscape, genre paintings and sporting scenes. He was trained by Henry Thiberge and worked as a draughtsman. During preparations for the World's Industrial and Cotton Centennial in 1884, Buck became associated with French architect Edouard Sidel, a gold-medal winner at the exposition. He assisted Sidel in commissions for the Caldwell Hotel and Morris Building in Birmingham, Alabama, and remained in the city in partnership with A. J. Armstrong in the firm of Armstrong & Buck.

Among the firm's first designs was a successful entry for the competition for the Fort Worth Board of Trade Building in Fort Worth, Texas. By the time the building was constructed in 1889, Armstrong had moved to Texas to staff Armstrong & Buck's "branch office" before leaving to join the partnership of Armstrong & Messer. Buck remained in Alabama and partnered with English architect John B. Sutcliffe. In 1889, Sutcliffe relocated to Chicago, Buck followed him there and continued their professional association.

== Career ==
Buck was a member of a group of young progressive Chicago architects sometimes referred to as "The Eighteen", who were friends and colleagues of Frank Lloyd Wright, Dwight Perkins, Robert C. Spencer, and others, who had offices in Steinway Hall. Buck maintained an office in Steinway Hall from 1902 through the 1920s.

Buck worked both prior to and contemporaneously with the Prairie School architects and his work at times resembles theirs, but it is not limited to the Prairie Style aesthetic. He drew on a wide range of forms to create simple yet dignified buildings that have tremendous appeal, whether in a simplified Tudor, Arts and Crafts, English cottage, Prairie Style or Colonial revival mode. For example, his 1909 house for Mrs. Helen Campbell in Palo Alto is designed in a modified Dutch Colonial style.

Architect Hermann V. von Holst featured a number of noteworthy houses by Buck in his books surveying the work of Chicago area architects, as did fellow architect and architectural writer Charles E. White, Jr. For von Holst, Buck created "Studies of Different Exterior Treatments of the Same Plan" showing variations that are Colonial, English Country, Italian Revival, Jacobean Revival and Georgian Revival. The Ladies Home Journal and House Beautiful magazines published homes which Buck designed; architects and builders in many parts of the country used these plans liberally. Buck marketed and sold plans for his buildings which were then constructed in other parts of the country, such as the Campbell House in Palo Alto, California, and the Nelson Bonny House in Norwich, New York.

Buck collaborated with women designers in his residential work, notably Elizabeth Eleanor D’Arcy Gaw (1868–1944) and Mary Mower who created interiors in the Arts and Crafts mode for his clients between 1901 and 1903. They formed what they called "The Crafters" group which was first located at 1013 Steinway Hall in Chicago, which also housed several of the Prairie School architects.

From 1907 to 1911, Buck worked in partnership with Edwin Besançon Clarke, an 1891 graduate of the University of Illinois. Some architectural historians speculate that Buck may have had a second office in Rockford, Illinois, during this decade as there are at least ten houses in Rockford that have been identified as his work. Buck was a member of the Arts Club of Chicago, North Shore Art League, and Ravinia Sketch Club. Buck died on August 17, 1929, in Ravinia, Illinois.

== Selected work ==
- Entrance Gates, Lincoln Park, Chicago, Illinois – (with John Sutcliffe)
- Lawrence Buck House, Rogers Park, Chicago, Illinois – 1904
- Charles H. Reeves, Jr., House, 454 West Iowa Street, Oak Park, Illinois (with Vernon Spencer Watson) – 1905
- Roycemore Private School for Girls, Evanston, Illinois (with Tallmadge and Watson)
- H. G. Wasson House, Pittsburgh, Pennsylvania – 1907
- Grey House at "Four Mounds Estate", 4900 Peru Road, Dubuque, Iowa – 1908
- Max H. Penwell House, Pana, Illinois – 1908
- E. H. Ehrman House, Oak Park, Illinois – 1908
- Wigell House, 1010 North Second St., Rockford, Illinois – 1908; The Rockford Public Library has plans for the Wigell house by Frank A. Carpenter, another Rockford architect, which calls the Buck attribution into question.
- Walter Boyle House, Rockford, Illinois – 1908
- Residence for J. S. Ely, Cedar Rapids, Iowa – 1908
- Nelson Bonney House, 80 S. Broad St., Norwich, New York – 1908 (mirror image of "The House Beautiful" 1908, "An Inexpensive House", built in Oak Park in 1907)
- Rachel McMullen House, 332 Morris SE, Grand Rapids, Michigan – 1908
- George McMullen House, 305 Morris, Grand Rapids, Michigan
- 1160 Bryant Street, Palo Alto, California – 1909
- Lawrence Buck Residence, Marshman Ave., Highland Park, Illinois (Ravinia), Illinois – 1911
- Elks Lodge, 210 W. Jefferson, Rockford, Illinois – 1912
- E. D. Moeng House, Columbia Avenue and the Beach, Rogers Park, Chicago, Illinois – 1912
- "Walden" the Cyrus H. McCormick House, N. Mayflower Road, Lake Forest, Illinois – 1915; associated architect
- The Allendale School, 600 East Grand Avenue, Lake Villa, Illinois – 1919 (with landscape architect Jens Jensen)
- Ellis Family Homestead, Pensacola, Florida
