= Etta Belle Lloyd =

- Born: 1860
- Died: January 6, 1929 (aged 68–69)
- Known for: Civic leader

Etta Belle Lloyd (1860 – January 6, 1929) was one of the most prominent and influential figures in the civic life of Pacific Grove, California.

== Early life ==
Etta Belle Lloyd was born in Utica, New York, in 1860, the daughter of David W. Lloyd (1831-1891), a merchant and hotel owner, and Elizabeth F. Roberts (d. 1902). She moved to California with the family when she was six months old and they were pioneers of the Monterey County. They moved to Pacific Grove, California, in 1887 where Davide Lloyd was the first permanent resident and merchant.

She attended the State Normal School at (now San Jose State University) San Jose, California, where she met fellow student Emily Williams, long-lasting friend, and taught school at Salinas, California.

== Career ==
She was one of the most prominent and influential figures in the civic life of the city: she supported the movement to keep the theaters closed on Sunday and worked for the new street paving for Lighthouse and Central Avenue. She was a member of the official board of the Methodist Episcopal church. She organized the Pacific Grove Musical Society, was one of founding members of the Pacific Grove Woman's Civic Club and was secretary and director of the city museum. Since 1891 she was a member of the Rebekahs.

She was state president of the Chautauqua alumni. She was a public speaker and wrote many articles for the press. She was an assistant to her father in carrying on his business at Pacific Grove and after his death she managed the Lloyd estate.

== Personal life ==
She was a benefactor of architect Emily Williams, to whom she gave two public commissions in Pacific Grove. The first, in 1907, was from the Woman's Civic Club to design a public "Look-Out" on a rocky promontory in the Pacific Ocean called Lovers Point. In early 1908, she lent $300 to Williams to allow her to buy a property at 218 and 220 Chestnut, Pacific Grove, where Williams built two houses, for her and her partner, Lillian McNeill Palmer. The property originally was owned by Lucy Washburn, a teacher at the San Jose Normal School that both Lloyd and Palmer had attended; later in 1910 Washburn later moved to a house at 215 Alder. The second commission from Lloyd to Williams, in 1910, was to remodel two large wooden cabins into an attractive club house for the Woman's Civic Club. Lloyd leased a building from the Natural History Museum at 172 Grand Avenue and other two building were donated by the Pacific Improvement Company. At the opening ceremony it was said that Lloyd and Williams "had presented [...] with two shells and [...] they have converted them into a beautiful home for themselves."

Etta Belle Lloyd died on January 6, 1929, at Pacific Grove, and is buried at El Carmelo Cemetery.
