= Elizabeth Eleanor D'Arcy Gaw =

Canadian artist (1868–1944)

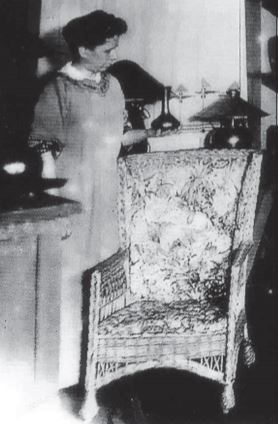
Elizabeth Eleanor D’Arcy Gaw

Elizabeth Eleanor D'Arcy Gaw (May 4, 1868 – November 12, 1944) was a prominent Arts and Crafts artist whose style influenced her former business partner Dirk van Erp and noted architect Lawrence Buck. She was the president of the California Guild of Arts and Crafts.

== Biography ==
Elizabeth Eleanor D’Arcy Gaw was born on May 4, 1868, in Montreal, Quebec, Canada, the daughter of Henry Woolsley Gaw (1834-1928), a brewer born in Ireland, and Elizabeth Jane Stripple (1842-1914). Her family moved to Idaho Springs, Colorado, before 1880 and Henry W. Gaw bought a brewery around 1876. They moved to Leadville before 1890 and The Gaw Brewery became the largest brewery in the area.

Elizabeth Eleanor D'Arcy Gaw attended local school in Leadville before entering the Art Institute of Chicago where she remained from 1892 to 1903 or 1904. Around 1899 and 1900 she moved to Denver and taught art and design at local high schools. Her designs were published in the school’s magazine and in national journals including International Studio. She worked as interior designer and, with two classmates of the Art Institute of Chicago, Lawrence Buck and Mary Mower, she opened "The Crafters" a firm that was advertised in House Beautiful from 1901 to 1903. Their studio-offices were located in Steinway Hall, the heart of Chicago's progressive architectural movement where Dwight Perkins, Robert C. Spencer, A. Phelps Wyman, and Frank Lloyd Wright also maintained their professional presence in the city. Though "The Crafters" remained active for only a few years, Buck continued to maintain his professional space at Steinway Hall well into the 1920s.

During the summer of 1904, she studied English Arts and Crafts in London at the Guild and School of Handicraft under Charles Robert Ashbee.

During the middle of the 1900s, her father sold the brewery and moved the family to San Jose, California. D'Arcy Gaw worked for Lillian McNeill Palmer in San Jose, between 1907 and 1908.

For a number of years, she was associated in business with Buck, that she knew from her Chicago time, when they worked together as "The Crafters". She made many of the floor plans and designs the interior decorating of his houses. Her specialty was interior decorating but she also won quite a name for herself for her hand wrought metal work and her designs in jewelry. Her designs for electric light fixtures, lamps and screens were particularly effective. In 1908 she worked as interior designer for the Grey House, now part of the Four Mounds Estate Historic District, part of the U.S. National Register of Historic Places. The metal-and-glass light fixtures flanking the entry and hanging down from the porte-cochere roof are Arts & Crafts fixtures featuring two versions of the Four Mounds logo. These fixtures may have been designed D'Arcy Gaw.

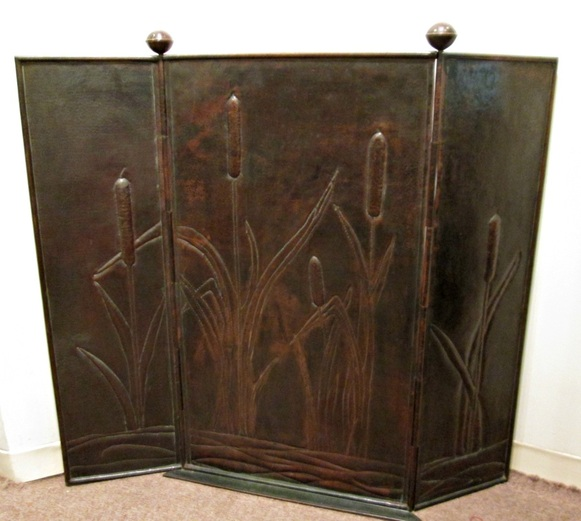
Cattail fire screen by Elizabeth Eleanor D’Arcy Gaw, c. 1909

In September 1909, D'Arcy Gaw entered into a partnership with Palmer's rival, Dirk van Erp, and they opened a studio on Sutter Street, San Francisco. From February 1910, the partnership began marking their wares with a stamped device of a windmill, with their names underneath. But it was really D'Arcy Gaw that was both designer and metalworker, and it was her copper and mica lamp designs what made the Van Erp Studios famous. In 1910, D'Arcy Gaw was the president of the California Guild of Arts and Crafts. The San Francisco Call said of their studio that it was "one of the most-interesting studios" in San Francisco "where, in conjunction, they conduct two classes a week in metal work and design. The interior of the attractive place was designed and executed by Miss Gaw. The harmonious tones of draperies and hangings, with the long, low shelves, settees and mission furniture, tend to make it bright and attractive along lines almost severe in their simplicity. Interior decorating and metal fixtures are really Miss Gaw's life work." The partnership with van Erp ceased on January 30, 1911; van Erp continued marking with the windmill device, with D'Arcy Gaw's name cut out from the stamp. The cutting-out of her name was not complete, and some wares can be found with a faint impress of some or all of the letters. Although their partnership lasted less than a year, D'Arcy Gaw exerted a strong and lasting influence on van Erp's design sensibility. He began making lamps to her design during this period, with shades incorporating mica panels.

In the middle of 1909, D'Arcy Gaw taught at a summer school and after she partnered with van Erp, she opened a private class for instruction in designing and metal work. She did work on the homes of Henry Gaw and J. R. Thompson in San Jose and floor plans and conventional interior designing for the house Mrs. H. Campbell in Palo Alto. When Palmer, who had closed her shop in 1917, went back in business in 1932, D'Arcy Gaw went back working with her through the 1940s.

Elizabeth Eleanor D'Arcy Gaw died on November 12, 1944, in Monterey, California, at age 76, and is buried at Oak Hill Memorial Park, San Jose, with her family.
