= Washburn Preparatory School =

Preparatory school in California, United States

Coordinates: 37°20′19″N 121°53′45″W

Location
- San Jose, California, United States

Information
- Type: Private
- Established: 1894
- Closed: 1911
- Headmaster: Arthur H. Washburn

Washburn Preparatory School or Washburn College Preparatory School (1894–1911) was a private preparatory school that was located at 165 Devine Street at the corner of San Pedro Street in San Jose, California.

== History ==
The school was founded by Jessica Thompson Washburn (née Jessica Benton Thompson, ?–1931). She attended the University of Michigan, class of 1884, and became in 1892 one of the first two women to graduate from Stanford University. She opened the school because she was concerned that there wasn't any school in the area that adequately prepared students for study at Stanford University or other elite universities. The curriculum for this school was based on the requirements to enter Stanford University.

=== Teachers and staff ===
Her husband, Arthur H. Washburn (1856–1921), also a Stanford University alumnus, served as the Washburn School head-master. Their son, Henry Lord Washburn also worked at the school. Lucy Washburn, Arthur's older sister was an experienced teacher and helped support the establishment of the school. The Washburns (Arthur, Jessica and Lucy) had all taught at the San Jose State Normal School before opening Washburn Preparatory School. California impressionist painter, Lucy Bacon taught art classes at the school.
