= Lillian McNeill Palmer =

American coppersmith and metalsmith

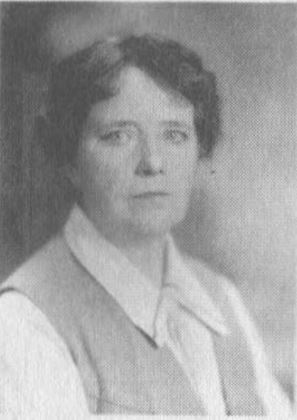
- Born: 1871; Connecticut
- Died: 1961 (aged 89–90); Los Gatos
- Known for: Light fixture design
- Movement: Arts and Crafts

Lillian McNeill Palmer (1871–1961) was an American coppersmith and metalsmith whose work was part of the California Arts and Crafts movement. She worked in tandem with her longtime companion, architect Emily Williams and was the founder of the Women's Business and Professional Club in San Francisco.

== Biography ==
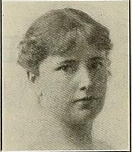
Lillian Palmer (1912)

Lillian Palmer was born in 1871, in Stonington, Connecticut, the daughter of Donald Palmer. Donald Palmer worked in the mining industry and traveled widely. Palmer moved to California with her family around 1890. By 1899 they were living in San Jose. Palmer was a second cousin of painter James McNeill Whistler, through Whistler's mother, Anna Matilda McNeill (1804-1881).

In 1898, at a social function in San Jose, Palmer met Emily Williams. When Williams' father died in 1899, she went to live with Palmer at her family home.

In the 1900s, Palmer worked as a writer and editor for the Mercury Publishing Company and started being interested in Arts and Crafts-inspired metalwork. In 1901 Palmer and Williams moved to San Francisco so that Williams, with Palmer's support, could study drafting and science at the California School of Mechanical Arts. In 1903, Palmer and Williams bought a property in Pacific Grove, to develop as a model cottage to showcase Palmer and Williams' ability in design and construction. The board and batten cottage at 246 Chestnut Street is still standing today.

After the 1906 earthquake in San Francisco, Palmer was among the first recorded metal artists using copper, lead and brass. In 1906, Williams designed the new Palmer family house on South Priest Street (now South 14th) in San Jose, which would later become the Arthur Monroe Free House, now on the U.S. National Register of Historic Places. Palmer and Williams lived with Palmer's family there and Palmer had a metal working studio in the basement from where she started her business of furnishing light fixtures. Her style had "an unmistakably feminine quality that distinguishes her work from her contemporaries". In April 1907, she was featured in the San Francisco Call who called her an "Ingenious Girl Worker in Metals". Elizabeth Eleanor D’Arcy Gaw (1868–1944) at first worked for her, before moving to work for Palmer's rival, Dirk van Erp (1862–1933), in San Francisco in 1909.

In early 1908, Lucy Washburn sold a property at 218 and 220 Chestnut, Pacific Grove, to Emily Williams to build two houses, for Williams (220) and Palmer (218). Both houses still stand today, and while Williams' house has been expanded and remodeled, Palmer's house is still in its original state.

In the middle of 1908, Palmer and Williams travelled to Europe and Asia to study art and architecture, specifically the Arts and Crafts movement that influenced Palmer's hammered metalwork. She did not have a formal training even if she took courses in metal crafting and electrical design in Vienna and later, back in the United States, power-efficient lighting and lighting placement for reducing eye strain in Chicago. They were back in the United States in January 1909.

Palmer and Williams moved to San Francisco where Williams' designed their own house on Broadway. In 1910, Palmer opened the "Palmer Copper Shop" on Sutter Street. She specialized "in designing fixtures that not only attain the desired lighting effects in a given room, but also conform to the style and contour of the room and the usage to which it is to be put. [The Palmer Shop's] substantial and widespread success is indicated by the fact that its electric fixtures are sought for and shipped to New York, Alaska and Mexico". Today, her lamps are collector's items. This time it was she that stole artists from van Erp, Harry St. John Dixon (1890–1967) and van Erp's nephew, August Tiesselinck (1890–1972), who worked for Palmer for a number of years. With the beginning of the World War I, metal was scarce, and Palmer was forced to close the shop in 1917.

In 1917, Palmer founded the Women's Business and Professional Club in San Francisco and was an active member and/or officer in many California State women's clubs. She was a public speaker, among her talks: "Electric Lighting of Dwellings from the standpoint of health, economic operation, science and ornament", "Starting in Business with Ninety Cents and No Experience", "Housewives Learning to Wield Saw and Hammer", and "Women as Builders of Business".

Palmer went back to metal work in 1932 and sometime in the late 1930s, Williams and Palmer moved to Los Gatos, where Williams designed their house. Williams died in 1942. Lillian Palmer died in 1961 and they are now resting together at the Los Gatos Memorial Park.

== Exhibition ==
At Home With Arts & Crafts was an exhibition hosted by the SFO Museum at the International Terminal, running from April 22, 2017, to December 10, 2017. The exhibition featured works by Lillian Palmer among others.
