= Dirk van Erp =

American coppersmith (1862–1933)

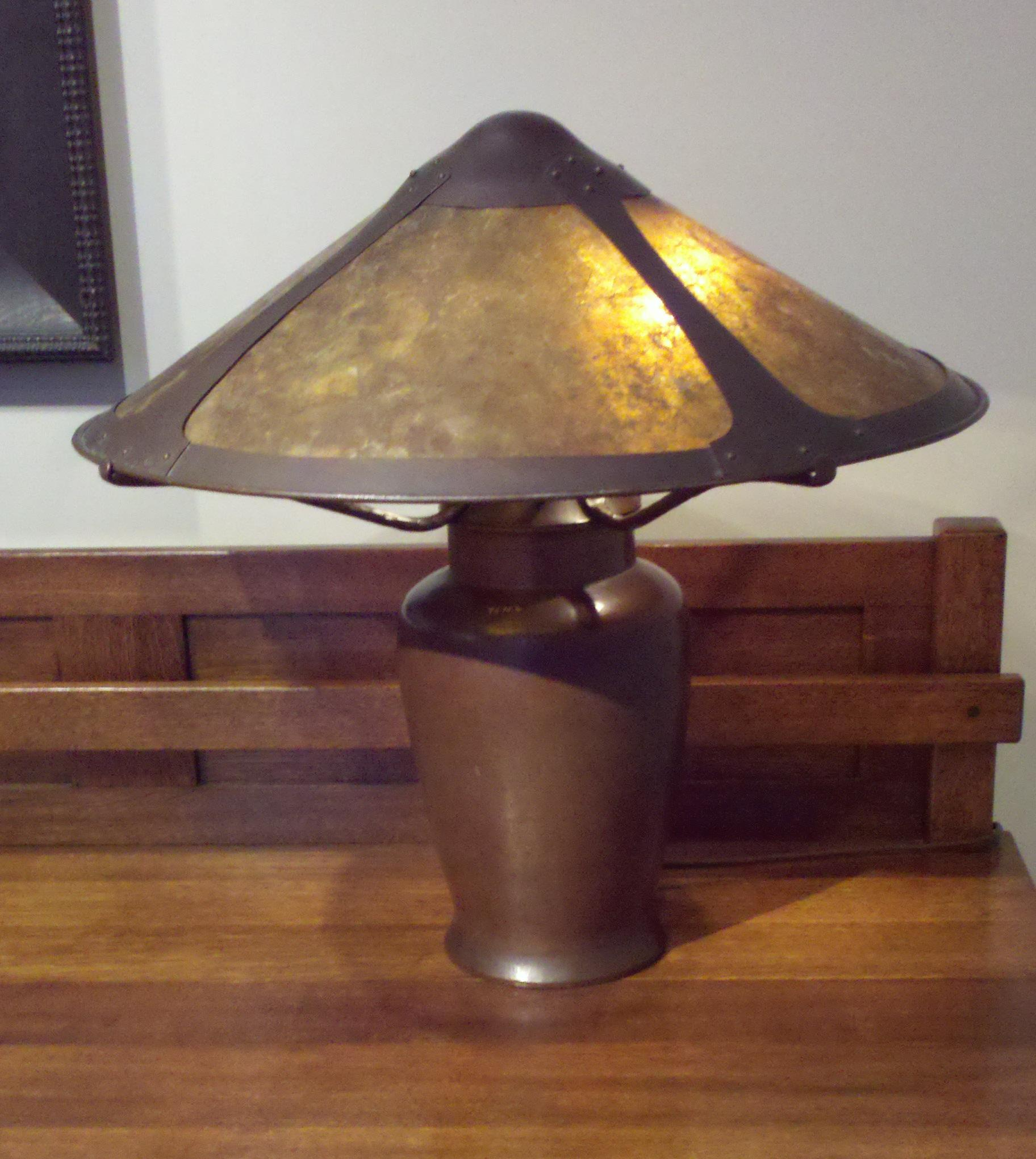
A copper lamp designed by Dirk Van Erp, displayed at the De Young Museum in San Francisco

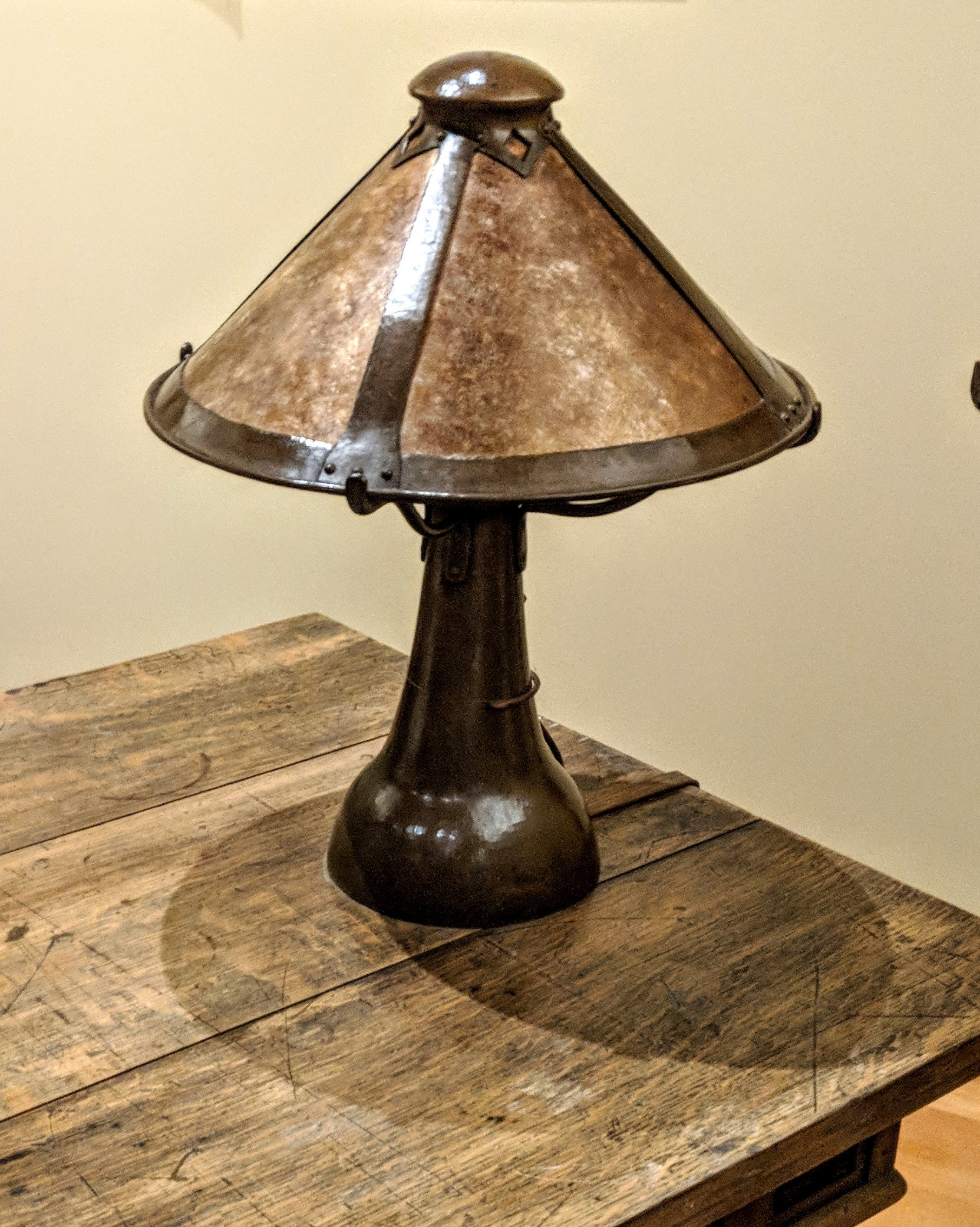
A Dirk van Erp lamp at the Oakland Museum of California

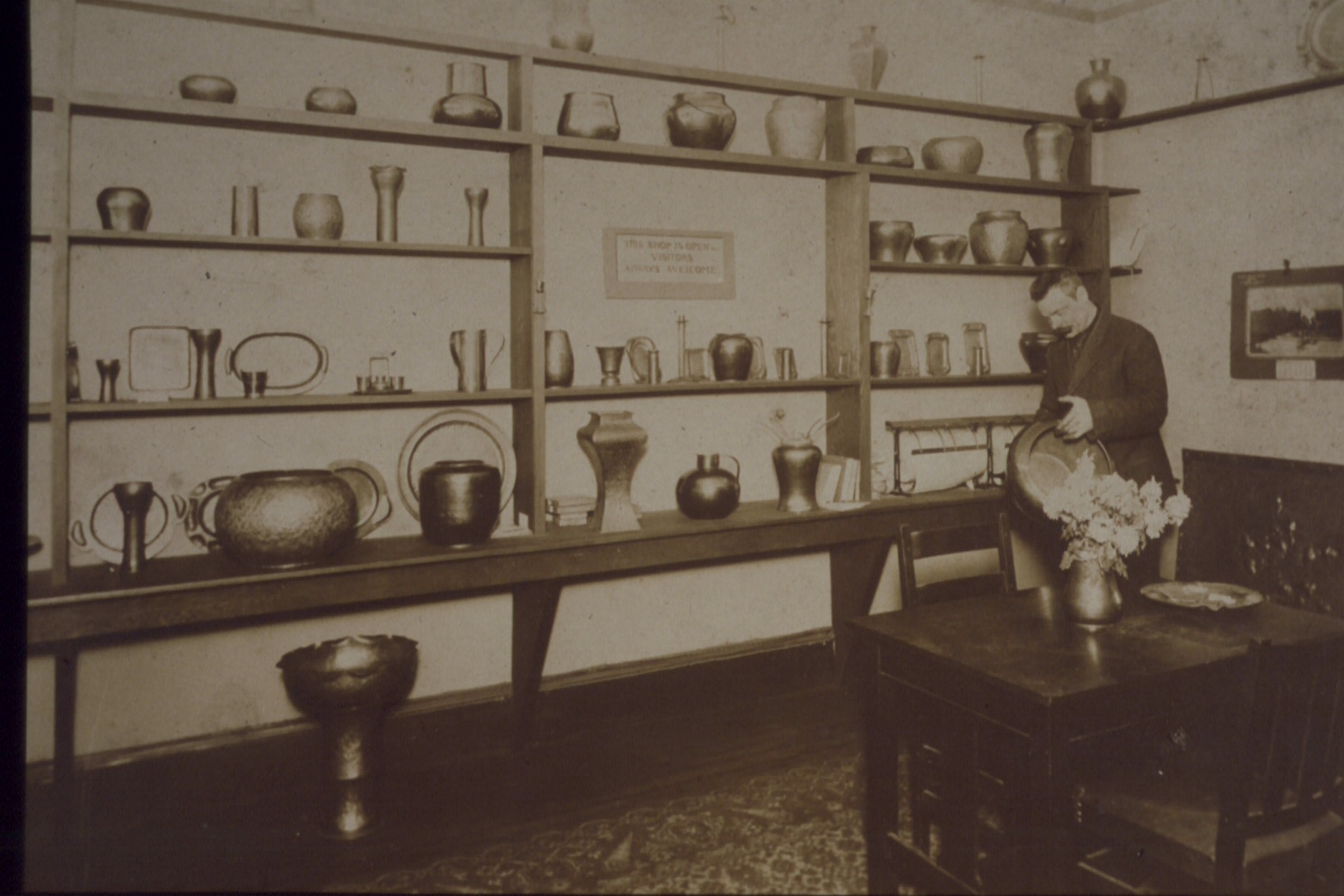
Dirk van Erp in his shop

Dirk Koperlager van Erp (1862–1933) was a Dutch American artisan, coppersmith and metalsmith, best known for lamps made of copper with mica shades, and also for copper vases, bowls and candlesticks. He was a prominent participant in the Arts and Crafts Movement, and was active in Oakland and San Francisco, California.

== Life ==
Dirk van Erp was born January 4, 1862, in Leeuwarden, Netherlands, the son of Willem van Erp and Agatha (born Agatha Tjepkema). Dirk's father and other family members were coppersmiths. He emigrated to the United States in 1890, and arrived in San Francisco in 1891, where he went to work for Union Iron Works. In 1892, he married Mary Richardson Marino and their first child, a daughter named Agatha, was born in 1894. In 1898, he traveled to the Yukon during the Klondike Gold Rush, but failed to find his fortune. He returned to work at the Union Iron Works later that same year. The couple's son, William Henry van Erp, was born in April 1901.

In 1900, van Erp moved to Vallejo, California, and got a job as a coppersmith at the Mare Island Naval Shipyard. He began making vases from brass shell casings as gifts to friends. About 1907 van Erp began selling to art galleries.

In 1908, he opened the Art Copper Shop in Oakland, and began exhibiting his work at local Arts and Crafts exhibitions. In 1909, he exhibited more than two dozen pieces at the Alaska-Yukon-Pacific Exposition, a World's Fair held in Seattle, Washington. His shop won a gold medal.

In September 1909 van Erp entered into a partnership with Elizabeth Eleanor D'Arcy Gaw (1868–1944), who had attended the Art Institute of Chicago. She had also studied English Arts and Crafts in London at the Guild and School of Handicraft, founded by Charles Robert Ashbee. They opened a studio at 376 Sutter Street, San Francisco in mid-September. From February 1910 the partnership began marking their wares with a stamped device of a windmill, with their names underneath. The partnership ceased on 30 January 1911; van Erp continued marking with the windmill device, with D'Arcy Gaw's name cut out from the stamp. The cutting-out of her name was not complete, and some wares can be found with a faint impress of some or all of the letters.

Although their partnership lasted less than a year, D'Arcy Gaw exerted a strong and lasting influence on van Erp's design sensibility. He began making lamps to her design during this period, with shades incorporating mica panels.

In 1915, van Erp exhibited at the Panama–Pacific International Exposition, a World's Fair held in San Francisco. During World War I, van Erp significantly reduced his artisan production, and returned to employment at Union Iron Works to contribute to the war effort. He resumed his prolific artisan production after the war ended in 1918. At some point van Erp's nephew, Auguste Tiesselinck, emigrated from the Netherlands to join his business.

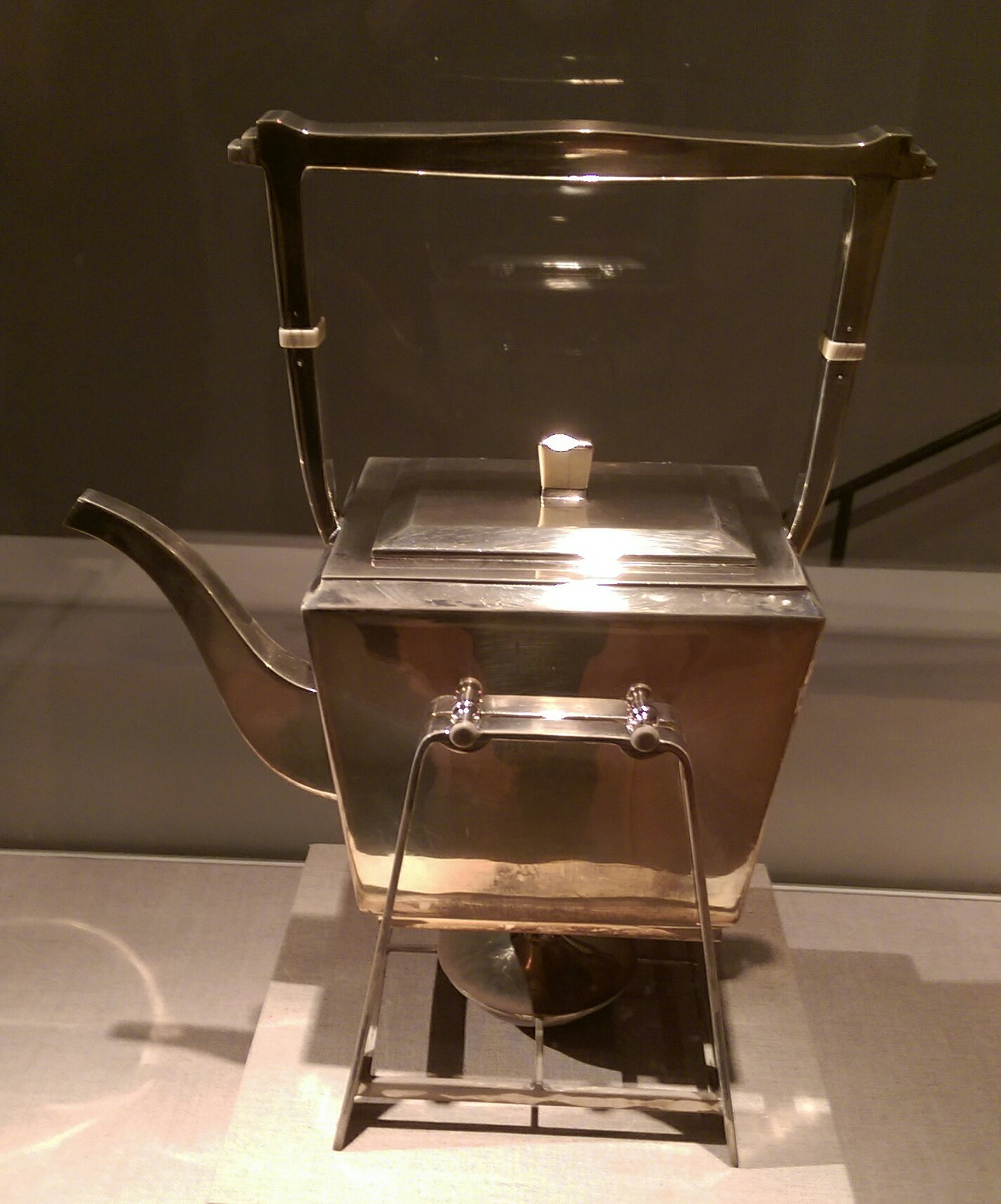
A silver kettle, stand and burner with ivory or bone accents, designed by van Erp, and made by his son, William Henry van Erp, approximately 1930. On display at the de Young Museum in San Francisco.

His career continued until his retirement in 1929. He died in Fairfax, California, on July 18, 1933. His wife, Mary van Erp, died four hours later. His son, William van Erp, continued to operate the shop until 1977, when he died.

== Legacy ==
Kenneth Trapp, curator for decorative arts at the Oakland Museum of California summarized van Erp's legacy as follows: "Although most famous for his lamps, many of which are commanding in size and stunning in design, van Erp produced other pieces of such exceptional beauty and strength as to stand unrivaled in American metalwork." Trapp concluded, "Dirk van Erp is widely considered the most important metalsmith of the Arts and Crafts movement"

A copper and mica lamp ca. 1912 - 1915, designed by D'Arcy Gaw and Dirk van Erp, is in the collection of the Metropolitan Museum of Art in New York City. It was donated in 1989 by Charles and Jane Kaufman.

In June, 2002, a copper and mica lamp designed by D'Arcy Gaw and made by Dirk van Erp was sold for US$180,000 at Craftsman Auctions in Lambertville, New Jersey. A van Erp copper vase sold for US$36,000 at the same auction.

On July 28, 2007, appraiser David Rago discussed a Dirk van Erp lamp on a segment of the Public Broadcasting Service series Antiques Roadshow filmed in Louisville, Kentucky. The value of the copper and mica lamp made around 1912 was estimated at US$40,000 to $50,000.

Van Erp's designs are widely emulated in reproductions on the present day market, in a wide range from high quality hand crafted work to lesser quality mass produced lookalikes.
