= Vickery, Atkins & Torrey =

American art gallery (1888–1933)

Vickery, Atkins & Torrey was an interior design firm and art gallery in San Francisco, California, that helped introduce California to Impressionism. It opened in 1888 on Grant Avenue at Morton Street (now called Maiden Lane), where it was destroyed in the 1906 fire, and after a few years reopened at 550 Sutter Street, where it stayed in business until 1933.

== History ==
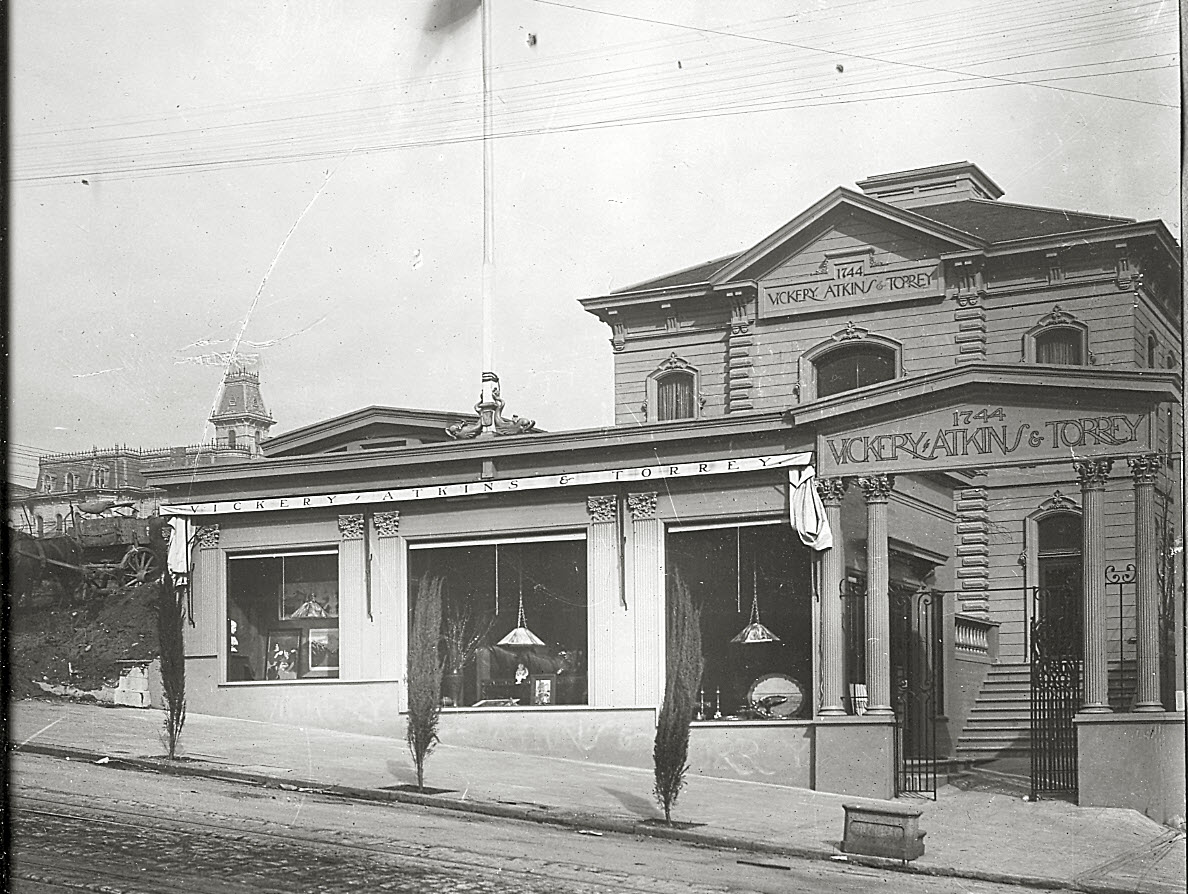
Vickery Atkins & Torrey at its temporary location on 1744 California Street after the San Francisco earthquake of 1906

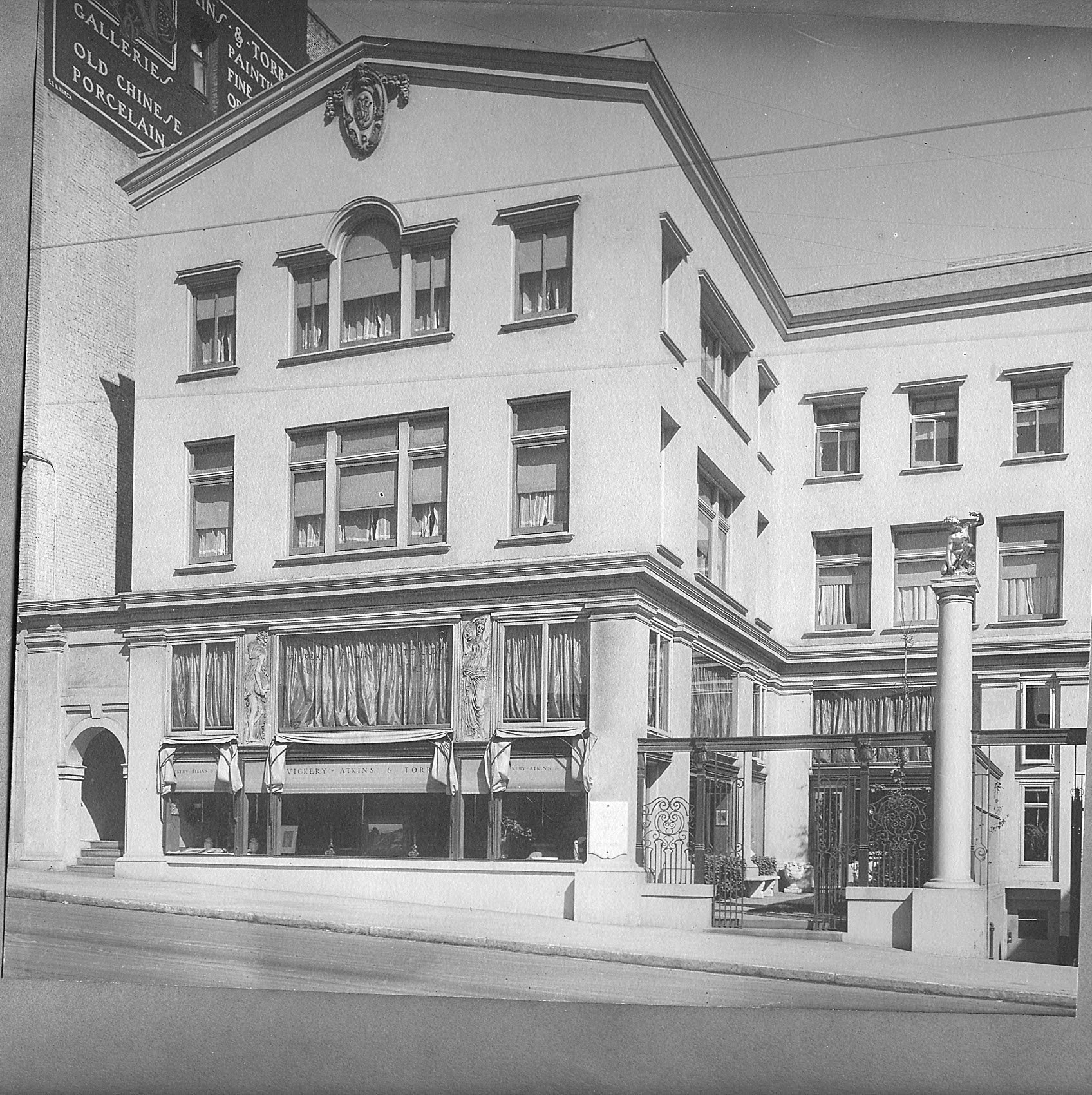
Vickery Atkins & Torrey at its permanent location on 550 Sutter Street after the San Francisco earthquake of 1906

William Kingston Vickery founded an interior design firm and art gallery in San Francisco in 1888 with his nephew Henry Atkins. In about 1891 they were joined by Frederick C. Torrey (1864–1935), a specialist in prints and Chinese porcelains. In 1900 the company became Vickery, Atkins & Torrey. During the 1890s William Vickery supervised a series of loan exhibitions that helped introduce Impressionism to California in the form of paintings by Monet, Eugène Boudin, Paul Cézanne, Camille Pissarro, Pierre-Auguste Renoir, and Edgar Degas. These pictures were lent by Californian impressionist Lucy Bacon, who studied in France under Camille Pissarro and met Paul Cézanne, and Mrs. William H. Crocker, the leading California patron of French Impressionist art at the time.

In its gallery, the company exhibited European, American and Japanese prints, Pictorialist photography, paintings and sculpture. Some of the prominent California artists who had one-person exhibitions there were Anne Bremer, Maynard Dixon, William Keith, Xavier Martinez, Francis McComas, Arthur Putnam, and Mary Curtis Richardson.

Vickery, Atkins & Torrey designed interiors for mansions, clubs and universities. The firm sold furniture, decorative objects and jewelry, including many works designed by Henry Atkins. The firm also published art books.

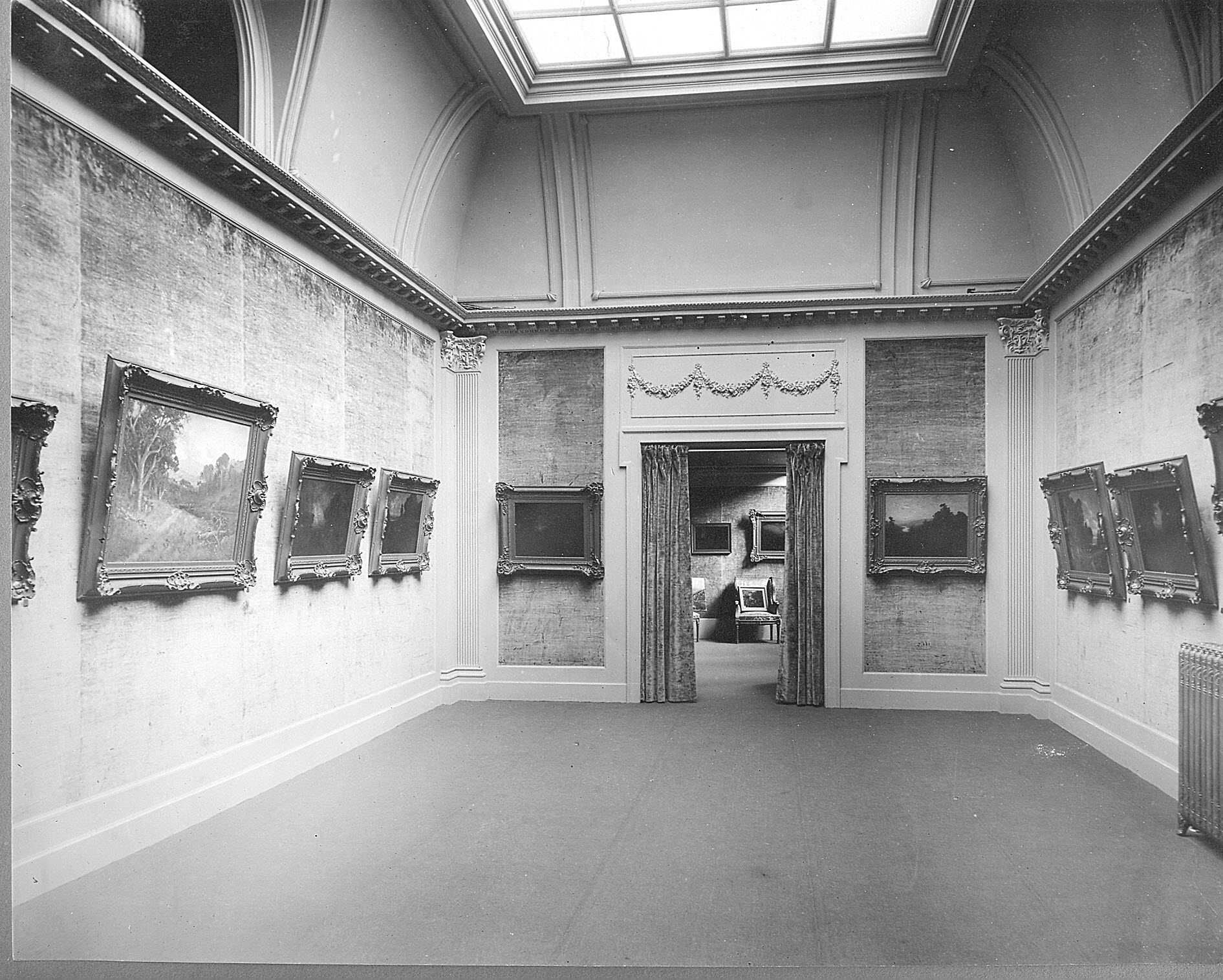
Picture Gallery

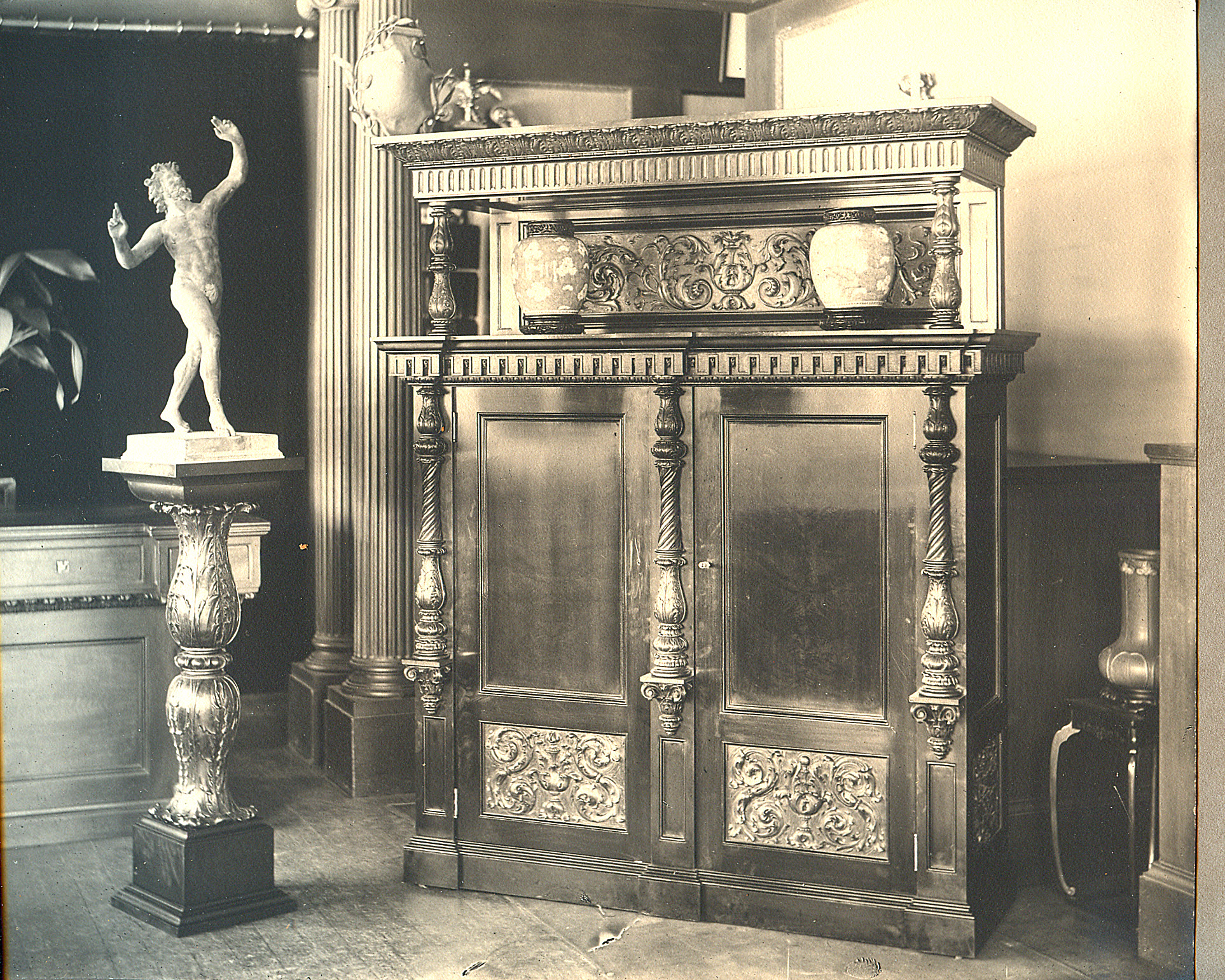
Furniture Gallery

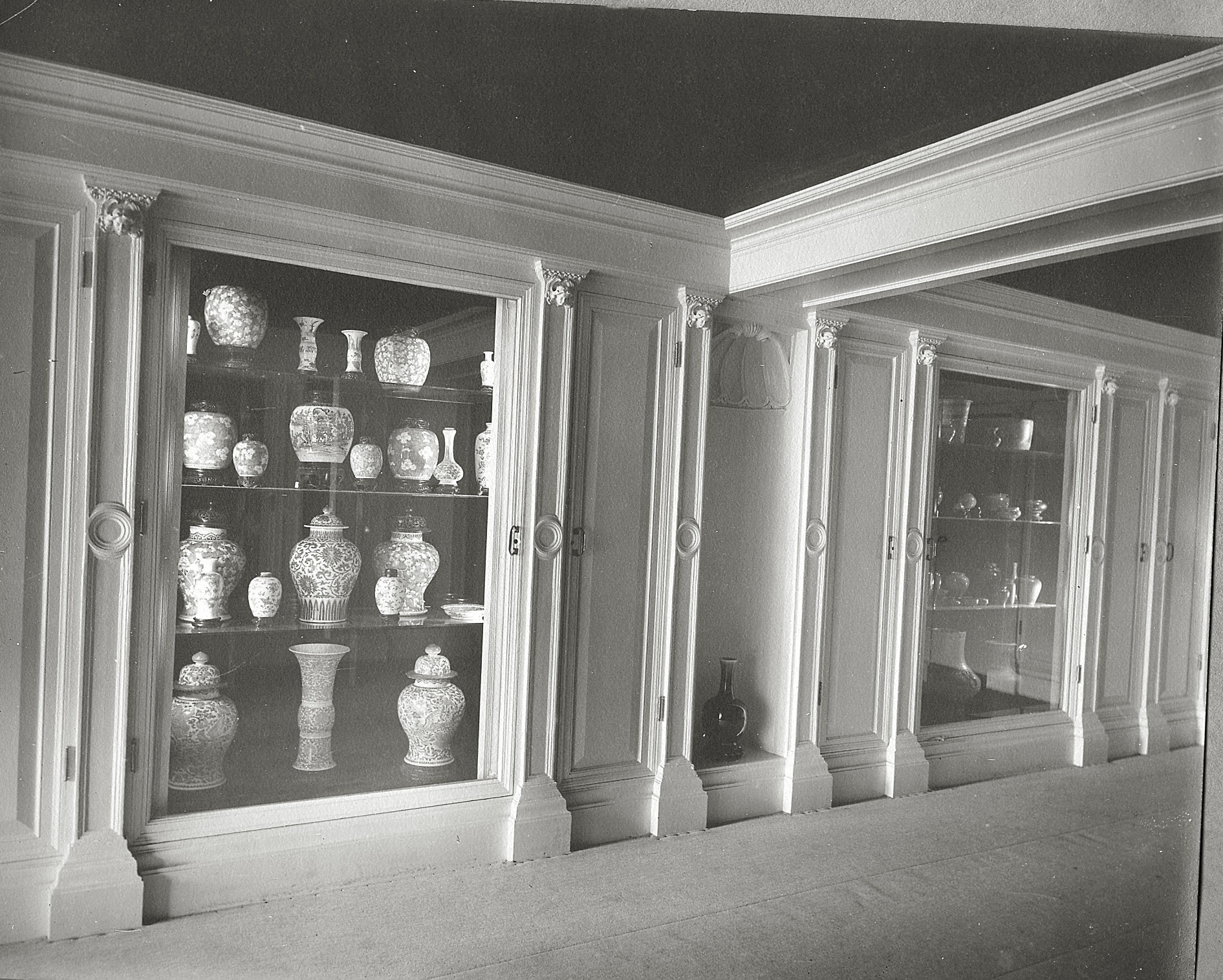
Fine China Gallery

Interior Views of Galleries at 550 Sutter Street

== Locations ==
Vickery, Atkins & Torrey moved to several locations within San Francisco during its existence:

- 22 Montgomery Street
- 126 Kearny Street
- 631 Market Street
- 108 Grant Street
- 236 Post Street (where it was located at the time of the 1906 earthquake)
- 1774 California Street (temporary location after the 1906 earthquake)
- 550 Sutter Street, San Francisco

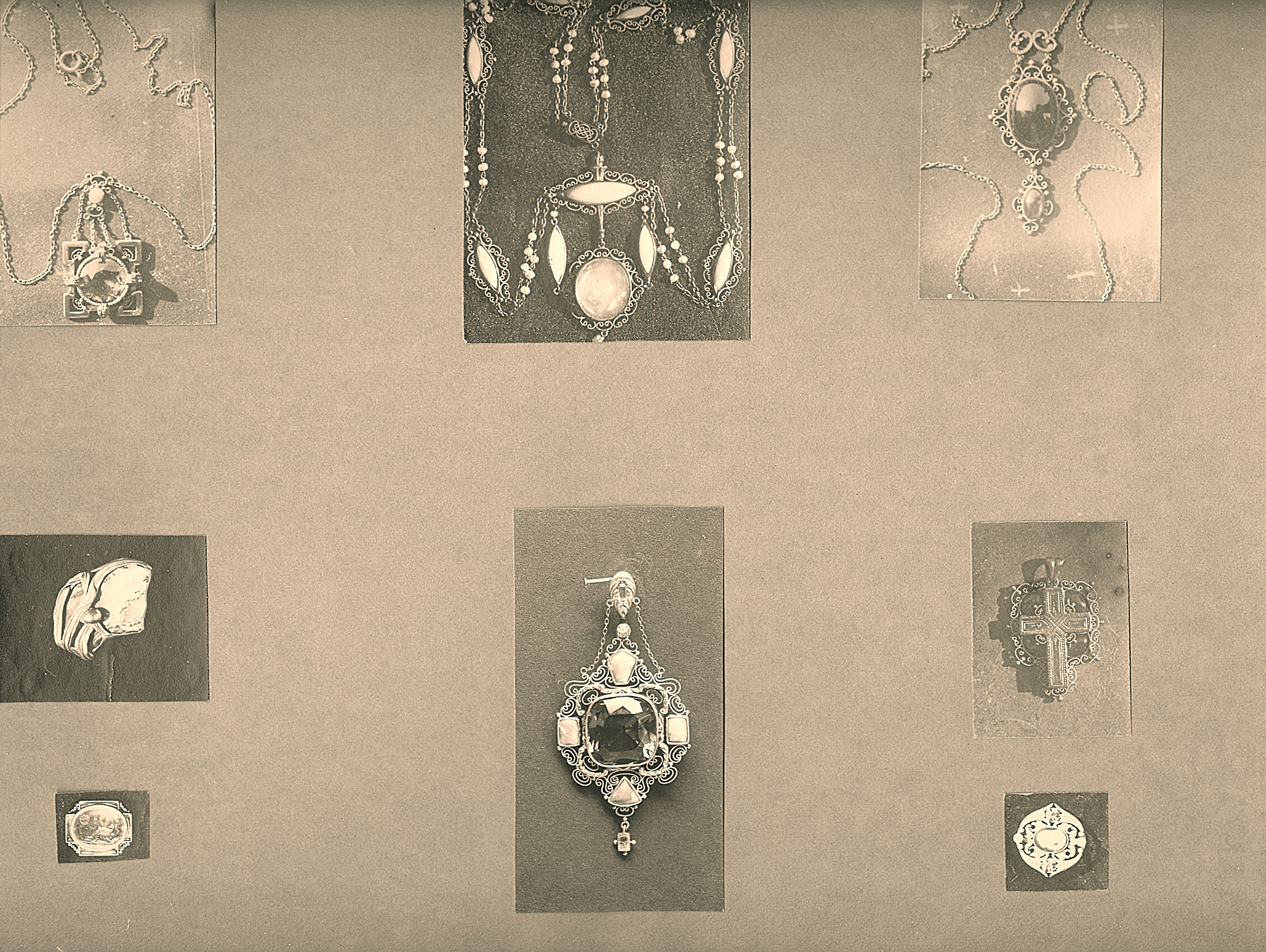
Jewelry designed by Henry Atkins
