= Lucy Bacon =

American artist (1857–1932)

Lucy Angeline Bacon
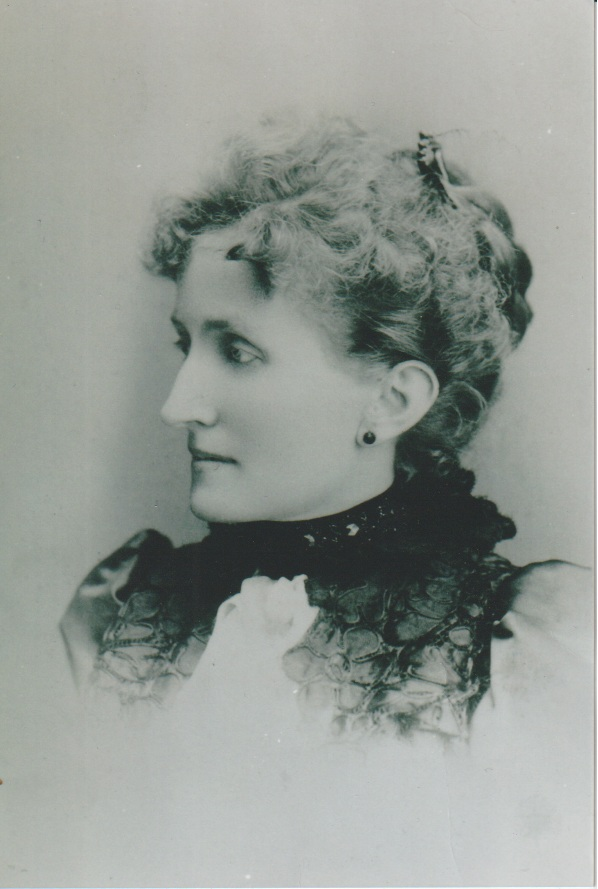
- Born: July 30, 1857; Pitcairn, New York
- Died: October 17, 1932 (aged 75); San Francisco, California
- Education: Art Students League of New York, National Academy of Design, Académie Colarossi, Camille Pissarro
- Known for: Painting
- Movement: Impressionism

Lucy Angeline Bacon (July 30, 1857 – October 17, 1932) was a Californian artist known for her California Impressionist oil paintings of florals, landscapes and still lifes. She studied in Paris under the Impressionist Camille Pissarro. She is the only known Californian artist to have studied under any of the great French Impressionists.

== Early life and education ==
Bacon was born in 1857 in Pitcairn, New York. She graduated by 1879 from the Potsdam Normal School in New York.

Bacon was related to Robert K. Vickery through the marriage of her niece Ruth. In the 1890s, his father was a part-owner of a San Franciscan gallery, Vickery, Atkins & Torrey, the first gallery to exhibit the Impressionism in San Francisco.

Bacon studied in New York City at the Art Students League and the National Academy of Design. In 1892, she left for Paris to continue her studies at the Académie Colarossi. She then studied with Camille Pissarro, as advised by American painter Mary Cassatt and painted alongside other impressionists, such as Paul Cézanne.

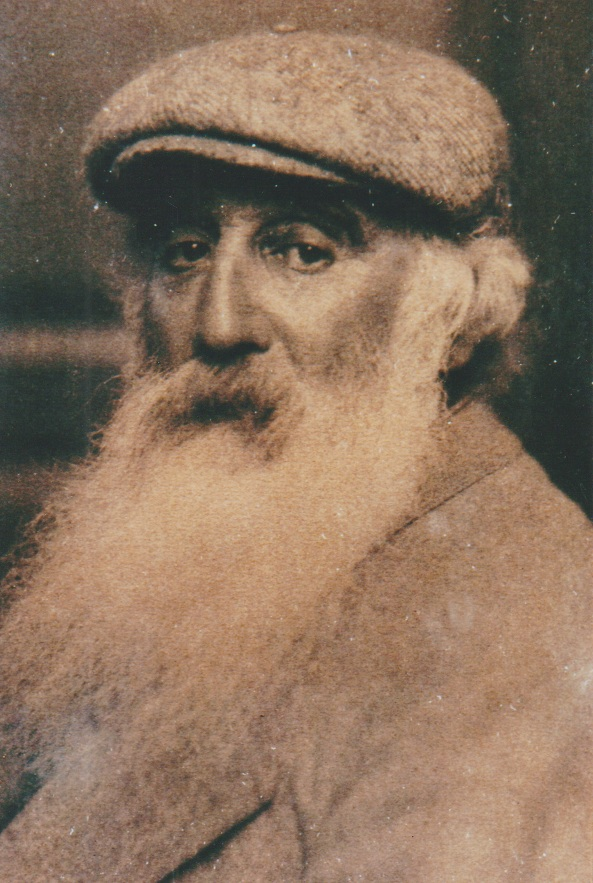
Camille Pissarro, impressionist painter and Bacon's mentor

== Career ==
Bacon later moved to Éragny, where she made impressionist-style paintings. By 1898, she lived in San Jose and was exhibiting paintings such as A San Jose Garden at the San Francisco Art Association. She moved to California in the hope of improving a chronic illness which limited her ability to paint. She taught at Washburn Preparatory School in San Jose and painted from her home studio.

In the spring of 1902, her works were exhibited at the Mark Hopkins Institute of Art in San Francisco. In 1905, while Lucy Bacon renounced her painting career and devoted herself to the Christian Science religion, possibly finding it eased her health problems. She continued to teach art.

By 1909, she was living in San Francisco. Bacon was a member of the Indian Fair Committee of the New Mexico Association on Indian Affairs (NMAIA) and Eastern Association on Indian Affairs (EAIA) in 1927, which exhibited works by Native American artists.

She died in San Francisco in 1932.

Her painting, Garden Landscape, made between 1894 and 1896, is among the collection of the Fine Arts Museums of San Francisco.

== Gallery ==
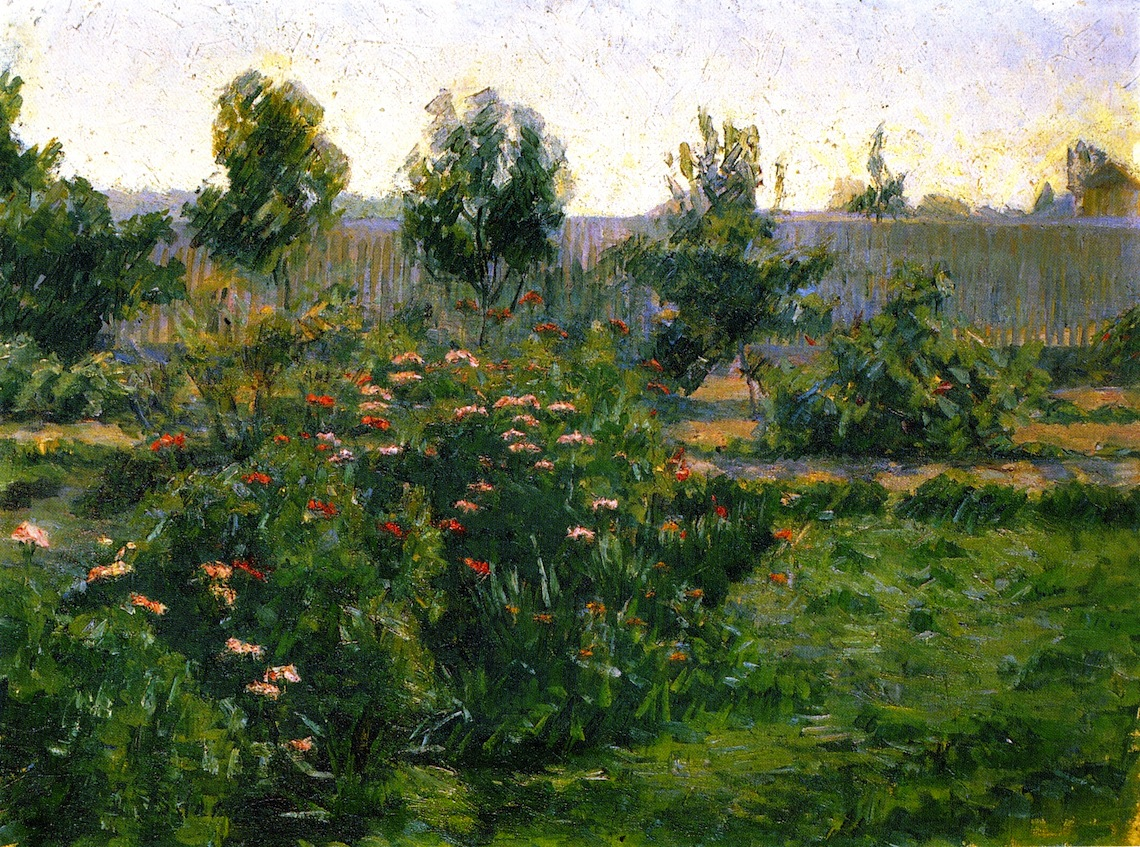
Garden Landscape (ca. 1984–1896)

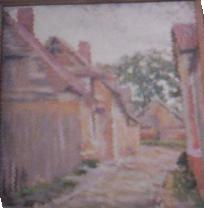
Gennevilliers (c. 1895), made when she was studying under Camille Pissarro

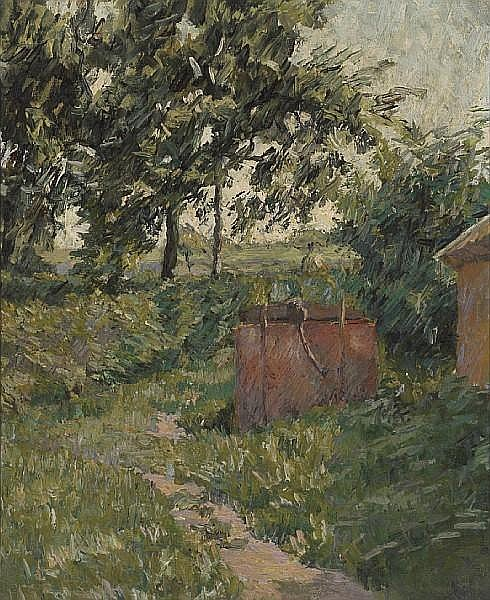
The Well by the Path, a gift to the artist's brother Albert Bacon

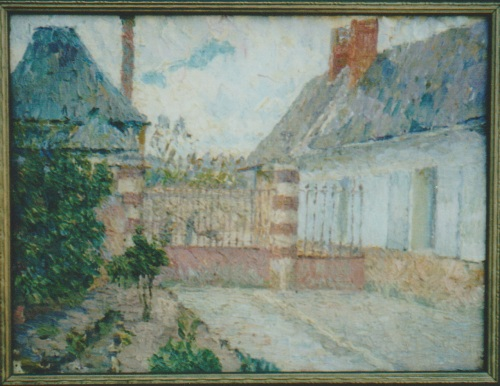
Eragny-sur-Epte (1886)

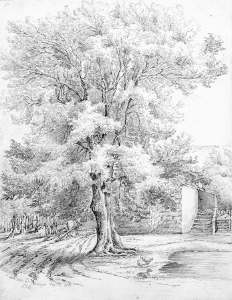
Sketch of an ash tree at Duffryn

== See also ==
- American Impressionism
