= Francis McComas (painter) =

Australian-American painter

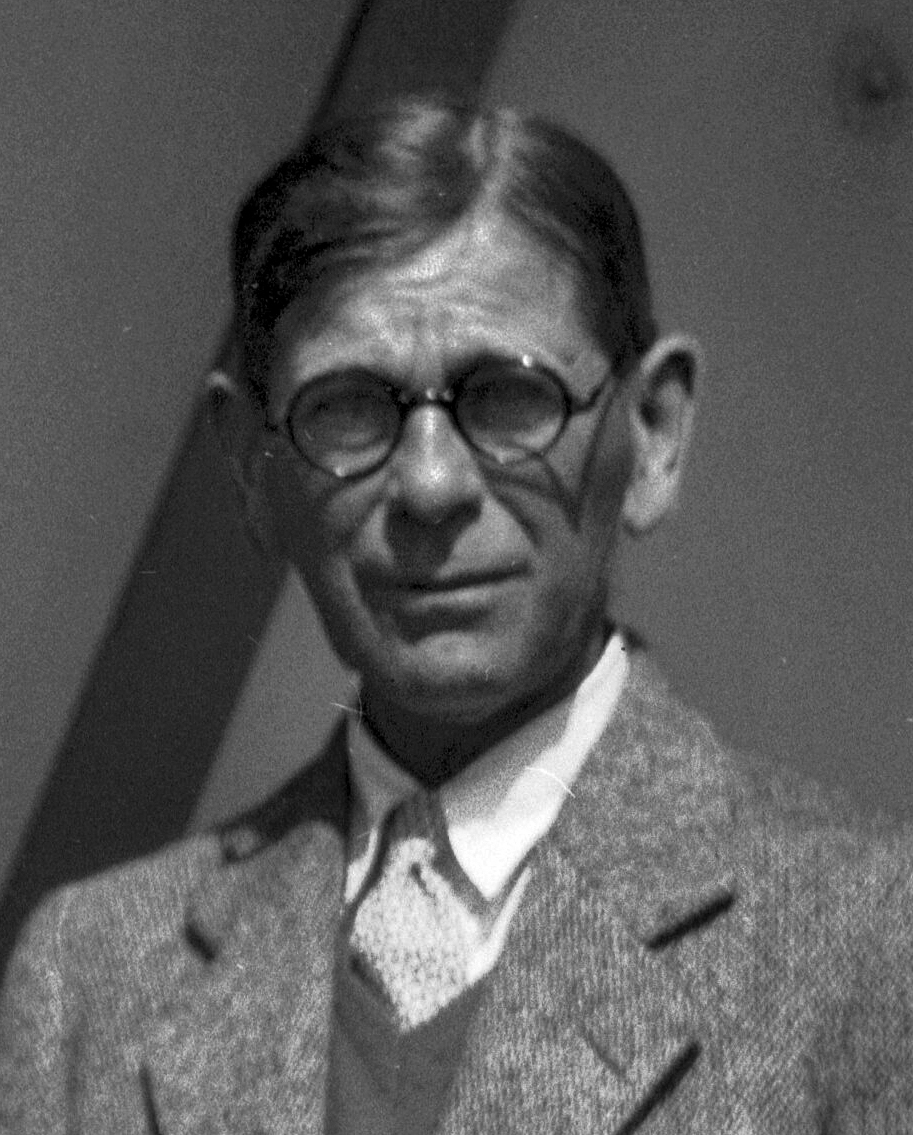
- McComas in 1930
- Born: October 1, 1875; Fingal, Tasmania, Australia
- Died: December 27, 1938 (aged 63); Pebble Beach, California, U.S.
- Spouses: Marie Louise Parrott (m. 1905; div. 1916) Gene Frances Baker (m. 1927)

Francis John McComas (1875–1938) was an Australian-born artist who spent most of his adult life in California, receiving some national recognition. He was one of the few California artists invited to exhibit in the 1913 International Exhibition of Modern Art in New York.

== Biography ==
=== Early life ===
Francis John McComas was born in Fingal, a small town in a valley of the same name in north east Tasmania. He studied art at the Sydney Technical College and the Sydney Art School. He arrived in San Francisco in 1898, having worked his way across the Pacific as a merchant seaman.

=== Personal life ===
He married a wealthy San Franciscan, Marie Louise Parrott, on June 28, 1905. But within three or four years he began avoiding spending time with his wife. In 1909, they made a few short visits to their home on the Monterey Peninsula, but Parrott spent most of that year in their home in Mill Valley, while her husband, who experienced repeated episodes of ill health, worked at his studio in San Francisco, preparing for a sketching trip to Arizona, New Mexico, and Mexico in July.

Between 1910 and 1915 McComas spent most of his time outside Monterey. His wife and her family requested a quiet divorce, which he refused or ignored, perhaps attempting to maintain his legal residence in the United States. To avoid living at the family home in Monterey, he briefly established in 1912 a separate residence in Carmel that he used to paint uninterrupted by his wife's demands. He carried on an affair with Gene Francis Baker, 13 years younger than he.

In 1916, Marie Louise McComas finally had enough of her husband's open infidelities on the Peninsula. The public divorce was a scandal for her and her family. She was granted the divorce by a Salinas judge on the grounds of “abandonment and mental cruelty." Excerpts of the messy divorce were published nationwide. The testimony and evidence revealed McComas' repeated meanness towards his wife:

"I will come home when I damned please and if you don’t like it you can get out," was the way Francis McComas, noted California artist, often addressed his wife, Marie Louise McComas, when she remonstrated with him for staying out days and nights and occasionally weeks at a time from their home in Monterey. . . . McComas did much to humiliate her, and on two occasions so distressed her that she had to go into the hands of a physician for six weeks, the nervous strain was so great.

On October 30, 1917, he married Gene Frances Baker. They lived on the Monterey Peninsula in Pebble Beach. They traveled extensively and McComas neglected his painting for several years. In 1936 McComas had a heart attack while visiting China. He died on December 27, 1938, in his Pebble Beach home.

=== Professional career ===
After visits to Hawaii and the Monterey, California Peninsula he exhibited 39 watercolors in February 1899 at the W. K. Vickery, Atkins & Torrey Gallery in San Francisco. This was the start of a brilliant career. He briefly settled in Alameda before embarking that fall on a trip across the United States, including an exhibition in Chicago, and eventually to France, where he studied at the Académie Julian. He returned in December 1901 to the Monterey Peninsula, where he established a studio, but spent much of his time in the San Francisco Bay Area exhibiting and fraternizing with the local artists. While living in Monterey, he visited geologically unique Point Lobos nearby, which he famously described as the "greatest meeting of land and water in the world."

In addition to his regular venues in northern California, which included Vickery's, the San Francisco Bohemian Club and Monterey's Hotel Del Monte, he exhibited in Los Angeles, Boston and New York City, and contributed to shows at the Berkeley, California, art colony in 1906 and 1909. He returned to Europe on a grand tour in 1907–08, which included a meeting with the king of Greece, and exhibited his California scenes at London's Obach Gallery and Carfax Gallery to positive reviews in the London Times.

In 1913 he exhibited watercolors in the famous Armory Show in New York City. In 1915 he served on the hanging committee and jury of awards at San Francisco's Panama–Pacific International Exposition, where he displayed 10 watercolors in the Arthur Mathews gallery. His extremely problematic marriage ended in divorce in 1916, with the scandalous details published in the national press. The following year witnessed important changes in his career. He began to deemphasize watercolors in favor of mural commissions in oil for the homes of wealthy Californians. On October 30, 1917, he married the young artist Gene (Eugenia) Francis Baker; the couple initially lived in Monterey before building their dream home in the neighboring and rather exclusive enclave of Pebble Beach. Between 1918 and 1921 he won awards at the Philadelphia Water Color Club, American Water Color Society (New York), and Pennsylvania Academy of Fine Arts. In 1923 he was hired by Cecil B. DeMille to design the sets for the Biblical epic, The Ten Commandments. Criticism of his Cubist-inspired submissions to a San Francisco exhibition may have led to his departure from the Bay Area art scene. By the mid-1920s McComas almost abandoned painting to consort with the idle wealthy of the Monterey Peninsula.

In the early-to-mid 1930s he reemerged as a serious artist with several exhibitions of new works, some of which were inspired by recent trips to Mexico and his meetings with Diego Rivera and José Clemente Orozco. His two enormous "charcoal murals with a background of Capagold" for a department store in San Francisco received national praise.

On July 28, 1988, The Carmel Art Association held an exhibition of paintings and graphics by six early Carmel Art Association members. McComas was one of them.
