= Emily Williams (architect) =

American architect (1869–1942)

Emily Eolian Williams
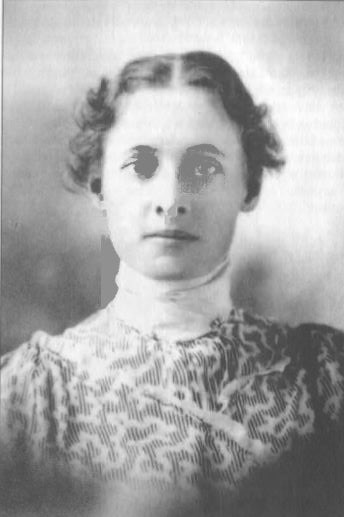
- Born: September 25, 1869; San Jose
- Died: June 3, 1942 (aged 72); Los Gatos
- Occupation: Architect

Emily Eolian Williams (September 25, 1869 – June 3, 1942) was a pioneering woman in architecture who was active in Pacific Grove, San Jose, and San Francisco in the early 20th century, at a time, when very few women were able to enter the profession. She mainly designed houses, with conveniently planned interiors, and a few institutional buildings and an exhibition stand at the Panama-Pacific International Exposition in San Francisco.

== Early life ==
The daughter of Edward Williams, president of the San Jose Water Works, and his first wife, Emily nee Miree, Emily Williams attended the California State Normal School in San Jose, today San Jose State University, and became a teacher in the Midway District, Santa Clara. She also studied at the University of the Pacific and, from 1892-93 to 1893-94, at the newly opened Leland Stanford University in Palo Alto.

== Architectural education ==
In 1901, Williams moved to San Francisco, where she studied for a semester drafting and architecture at a high school, the California School of Mechanical Arts, now the Lick-Wilmerding High School. She tried to find a job as an architectural “draftsman” but was rejected as women were considered as not belonging in architecture. In San Francisco, she met a science teacher, Lilian Bridgman, who also aspired to become an architect and had already designed her own house with the encouragement of architect Bernard Maybeck. This quite likely encouraged Emily to continue her pursuit of architecture. However, Emily's projects remained small-scale and mainly domestic.

In order to gain experience, she used an inheritance from her father to build a small cottage in Pacific Grove with the help of metal artist Lillian McNeill Palmer. The two women, who completed all the work “with their own fair hands” without the help of craftsmen, received attention from the press and soon became a tourist attraction. The cottage is still inhabited today.

== Residential designer ==
Williams' first client was her older sister, Edith, who believed in Emily's abilities and commissioned three cottages on adjacent lots as income property. Further commissions came from acquaintances of the Williams family and feminists such as Dr. Anna Lukens who wanted to avoid the harsh winters of New York and spend time in mild California. Another client was the well-off Mrs. Lucy Pray who wanted her daughter to have a college education at the University of California. She commissioned a house in Berkeley so that her daughter could live at home while studying. Another prominent client was Mrs. Jessie Jordan, wife of Stanford University President David Starr Jordan, who commissioned Emily to design a house for them in nearby Carmel while her husband was travelling. The Jordans knew Emily from the time she studied at Stanford. Donald and Annie Palmer, the parents of Lillian, asked her to design a house at 66 South Priest (now 66 South Fourteenth) Street in San Jose, where Lillian and Emily lived at times. This house, a listed historic property, is today known as the Arthur Monroe Free House, named after its second owner, a lawyer and US Representative.

== Role model ==
She also served as a role model for at least one woman desiring to become an architect. In 1907, Emily designed a large house in San Francisco for Mrs. Gertrude Austin, a former resident of San Jose who knew the Williams family. While the design of the house was underway, the young Elizabeth Austin, then a student of architecture at the University of California at Berkeley, may have been able to participate in the discussion of the project between her mother and the architectural designer, Emily Williams, and observe the construction.

== Publicity ==
Small notices in the local Pacific Grove Daily Review and other dailies and an article in the San Jose Mercury and Herald – probably written by Lillian Palmer, who worked for the Mercury – resulted in commissions in Pacific Grove, Carmel, San Jose, San Francisco, and Berkeley (see list below).

Around 1914, Williams received a most unusual commission for an exhibition stand for the Alaska Garnet Mining and Manufacturing Company which was owned and run by twelve women from St. Paul, Minnesota. The connection was quite likely established through Don Palmer (father of Lillian Palmer) who was a mining engineer. Unfortunately, no photographs or illustrations of the design have been found.

== Designs of public buildings ==
With the help of benefactor Etta Belle Lloyd, Emily received two public commissions in Pacific Grove. The first, in 1907, was from the Woman’s Civic Club to design a public “Look-Out” on a rocky promontory in the Pacific Ocean called Lovers Point. The second commission, a few years later, was to remodel two large wooden cabins into an attractive club house for the Woman’s Civic Club. Despite the publicity generated by these projects, Williams did not seem to have gained any new clients from the woman’s club.

== Personal life ==
Around 1898, Williams met Lillian McNeill Palmer. Palmer encouraged Emily to pursue her dream of becoming an architect and Emily supported Lillian's desire for journalism and metal artistry.

After Emily’s father died in 1899, she moved in with the Palmer family, and was accepted as a family member by Lillian’s parents, Donald and Annie Palmer. In the 1910 US Census, she is listed as an “adopted“ daughter of the Palmers.

In 1908, Emily and Lillian traveled to Europe and Asia for pleasure and study. In Vienna, Emily studied classical architecture and Lillian metal work. On their return, they settled in San Francisco and Lillian was successful producing and selling her metal artwork at "The Palmer Shop". Emily received only a few commissions but built their own home at 1037 Broadway and a weekend cabin “Wake Robins” in the Santa Cruz Mountains. Around 1920, the Palmers moved to Los Gatos and Emily designed a house for herself and Lillian on the same property. They lived in the Santa Cruz Mountains during the Great Depression while they rented out their San Francisco and Los Gatos houses for income.

She also designed two investment properties for herself and Lillian which, in the end, did not produce the anticipated financial gains as they could not maintain the necessary payments and had to sell them.

Williams and Palmer lived together as partners until Williams' death in 1942.

== Networking ==
As earlier in Pacific Grove, Emily networked through the women’s network such as the Pacific Grove Woman’s Civic Club, and in San Francisco the Business and Professional Woman’s Club which was founded by Lillian Palmer. She used the Club’s newsletter The Business Woman for an advertisement geared especially to women:

- "Like a Dress, Ready-Made Buildings Are Seldom Made To Fit"
- "Architecturally Designed Dwellings Mean Real Homes"
- "A well-planned structure, whether a concrete building or a week-end cabin, should to the smallest detail, suit your individual needs."
- "Before you build Consult EMILY WILLIAMS"

Despite these networking efforts, Emily received only a few commissions in the early 1920s, and appears to have stopped working as an architect in 1924.

== Death ==
Emily Williams died in 1942 in Los Gatos, suffering from lifelong asthma, and is buried at the Los Gatos Memorial Park, San Jose, California. She was eulogized by a moving obituary, probably written by her partner Lillian:

Death Wednesday morning, June 3, brought to a close the colorful life and career of Miss Emily E. Williams, beloved clubwoman and Los Gatos resident whose girlhood determination to establish women's rights in the business world led to personal success as an architect and gave inspiration to all women careerists.... With her death is also severed a "life-partnership" with Miss Lillian Palmer, whose own similar ideals concerning women's rights first aligned the two women together and formed the basis for a friendship of forty-four years duration....

== Works ==
- Williams-Palmer House/Cottage, 246 Chestnut Street, Pacific Grove, 1903
- Edith Williams 1st House, 242 Chestnut St, Pacific Grove, 1904
- Edith Williams 2nd House, 241 Alder St, Pacific Grove, 1904
- Edith Williams 3rd House, 243 Alder St, Pacific Grove, 1904
- Lucy Mabel Pray House, 1325 Spruce, Berkeley, 1904
- Reverend George W. Foote House (demolished), 475 Spencer Avenue, San Jose, 1906
- House near Beach (not found), beach, Carmel, 1906
- Sequoia Lodge by the Sea (Dr. Anna Lukens House), 529 Ocean View Boulevard, Pacific Grove, 1906
- Palmer House (now Arthur Monroe Free House), 66 S. Priest now S. 14th Street, San Jose, 1906
- Gertrude Austin House, 2728 Union Street, San Francisco, 1907
- Lillian Palmer House, 218 Chestnut, Pacific Grove, 1907
- Emily Williams House, 220 Chestnut, Pacific Grove, 1907
- Jordan House (demolished), NE corner of Camino Real & 7th, Carmel, 1907
- W.B. Richards House, 119 Grand Avenue, Pacific Grove, 1907
- Pacific Grove Lookout (demolished), Lovers' Point near Japanese Tea Garden, Pacific Grove, 1907
- House for a prominent man, (not located), Berkeley, 1909
- House in an interior town, (not located), 1909
- Alice Wright House, 1715 Dayton Avenue, Alameda, 1909
- Deer Park Inn Remodel, Highway 89/Alpine Meadows Rd, Tahoe City, 1909
- "Wake Robin" Weekend House, 20075 Gist Road, Lexington Hills, Los Gatos, 1910
- Pac. Grove Woman's Civic Club (demolished), 172 Grand Avenue, Pacific Grove, 1910
- Howell House, 245 Ocean View Blvd., Pacific Grove, 1911
- McIntire House, 117 S.17th Street, San Jose, 1913
- Williams-Palmer House, 1037 Broadway, San Francisco, 1913
- PPIE exhibition booth, Palace of Varied Industries, PPIE San Francisco, 1914–15
- Williams-Palmer House, Addition of, 1037-39 Broadway, San Francisco, 1921
- second story Additions to TenWinkel Cottage, 1071-73 Lombard St, San Francisco, 1922
- Hill House, 426 36th Avenue, San Francisco, 1923
- Cassidy House, 424-26 Mississippi, San Francisco, 1924
- Kennedy House, 1027-31 Broadway, San Francisco, 1924
- Williams-Palmer House, 151 Whitney Avenue, Los Gatos, pre 1924

== Recognition ==
An article published in the San Jose Mercury Herald on November 11, 1906, stated: "Miss Williams' houses have won her an enviable reputation... They are not only beautiful and artistic, but convenient, livable and planned to save steps and with places to put things." The article explained that Williams' interiors were better than those designed by men.

== See also ==
- Women in architecture

== Literature ==
- Women as Architects - With Special Application to Miss Emily Williams, San Jose's Successful Woman Architect, Sunday San Jose Mercury and Herald, 1906-11-11, p. 19/5.
- Douglas, Jack, Lillian McNeill Palmer: Naglee Park Artisan, Naglee Park Campus Community Advisor, Spring 2001, http://www.nagleepark.org/pdf/AdvisorSpring2001.pdf, retrieved 8-8-2017
- Douglas, Jack, Naglee Park Home Added to the National Register, Naglee Park Campus Community Advisor, Spring 2002, http://www.nagleepark.org/pdf/AdvisorSpring2002.pdf, retrieved 8-8-2017.
- Douglas, Jack, Emily Williams, Architect and Feminist, Naglee Park Campus Community Advisor, June 2003, http://www.nagleepark.org/pdf/AdvisorSpr2003.pdf, retrieved 8-8-2017.
- Horton, Inge S., Emily Williams, San Jose’s First Woman Architect, Continuity, V. 17, no. 4 (Winter 2006): p15-16, http://www.preservation.org/newsletters/winter2006.pdf, retrieved 8-8-2017.
- Allaback, Sarah, The First American Women Architects, University of Illinois Press, Urbana, IL, 2008, p. 229-230.
- Diehl, Sarah J., "Emily E. Williams (1869–1942): Early Pacific Grove Architect", Heritage Society of Pacific Grove, 2009, 2
- Horton, Inge Schaefer, Early Women Architects of the San Francisco Bay Area: The Lives and Work of Fifty Professionals, 1890–1951, 2010, McFarland & Company, Jefferson, NC, ISBN 978-0-7864-4656-8.
- Horton, Inge S., "Emily Williams: San Jose's First Woman Architect", Newsletter of PAC San Jose, Vol.17, No.4. Retrieved 5 March 2012.
- Susan Dinkelspiel Cerny, An Architectural Guidebook to San Francisco and the Bay Area, Gibbs Smith, 2007. p. 208.
- Ulleseit, Linda, Under the Almond Trees, 2014, Flying Horse Books, Independent Publishing Platform, ISBN 978-1499252200.
