= List of Major League Soccer transfers 2026 =

Major League Soccer transfers in 2026

The following is a list of transfers for the 2026 Major League Soccer (MLS) season that have been made during the 2025–26 MLS offseason all the way through to the roster freeze in September 2026.

== Transfers ==
List of 2026 MLS transfers
Date	Name	Moving from	Moving to	Mode of Transfer
November 12, 2025	(Turks and Caicos Islands) Samuel Harvey	(Turks and Caicos Islands) AFC Academy	Seattle Sounders FC	Free
November 14, 2025	(United States) Cielo Tschantret	(United States) Sporting Kansas City II	Sporting Kansas City	Homegrown player
November 18, 2025	(United States) Luca Bombino	Los Angeles FC	San Diego FC	Trade
November 19, 2025	(United States) Oscar Verhoeven	San Jose Earthquakes	San Diego FC	Trade
November 24, 2025	(Canada) Félix Samson	(Canada) CF Montréal Academy	CF Montréal	Homegrown player
November 24, 2025	(United States) Ervin Torres	(United States) Austin FC II	Austin FC	Homegrown player
December 3, 2025	(United States) Charlie Sharp	Toronto FC	(United States) Indy Eleven	Free
December 8, 2025	(United States) Thomas Williams	Orlando City SC	Nashville SC	Trade
December 9, 2025	(Ghana) Forster Ajago	Real Salt Lake	(United States) Sacramento Republic	Free
December 9, 2025	(United States) Noah Cobb	Atlanta United FC	Colorado Rapids	Trade
December 9, 2025	(United States) David Vazquez	Philadelphia Union	San Diego FC	Trade
December 10, 2025	(United States) Stefan Cleveland	Austin FC	Sporting Kansas City	Trade
December 10, 2025	(Venezuela) Santiago Pita	(United States) Atlanta United 2	Atlanta United FC	Homegrown player
December 10, 2025	(United States) Jason Shokalook	(United States) Chicago Fire FC II	Chicago Fire FC	Free
December 10, 2025	(Iceland) Dagur Dan Þórhallsson	Orlando City SC	CF Montréal	Trade
December 10, 2025	(Colombia) Brayan Vera	Real Salt Lake	CF Montréal	Trade
December 12, 2025	(Canada) Max Anchor	Vancouver Whitecaps FC	Seattle Sounders FC	End of Year Waivers
December 15, 2025	(United States) Nikola Djordjevic	(Canada) Whitecaps FC 2	Vancouver Whitecaps FC	Free
December 15, 2025	(Norway) Jakob Glesnes	Philadelphia Union	LA Galaxy	Trade
December 15, 2025	(United States) Jamir Johnson	Philadelphia Union	LA Galaxy	Trade
December 15, 2025	(Canada) Josh-Duc Nteziryayo	(Canada) CF Montréal Academy	CF Montréal	Homegrown player
December 15, 2025	(Spain) Sergio Reguilón	(England) Tottenham Hotspur	Inter Miami CF	Free
December 16, 2025	(Jamaica) Jon Bell	Seattle Sounders FC	Austin FC	Free
December 16, 2025	(United States) Hassani Dotson	Minnesota United FC	Seattle Sounders FC	Free
December 16, 2025	(Scotland) Lewis Morgan	New York Red Bulls	San Diego FC	Trade
December 16, 2025	(United States) Peter Stroud	New York Red Bulls	Minnesota United FC	Trade
December 17, 2025	(Israel) Tai Baribo	Philadelphia Union	D.C. United	Trade
December 17, 2025	(United States) Britton Fischer	(United States) Minnesota United FC 2	Minnesota United FC	Free
December 17, 2025	(Moldova) Mihail Gherasimencov	(Canada) Whitecaps FC 2	Vancouver Whitecaps FC	Homegrown player
December 17, 2025	(United States) Ryan Sailor	Inter Miami CF	Seattle Sounders FC	Free
December 18, 2025	(Ghana) Kwaku Agyabeng	(United States) Clemson Tigers	Sporting Kansas City	SuperDraft
December 18, 2025	(United States) Richie Aman	(United States) Washington Huskies	D.C. United	SuperDraft
December 18, 2025	(United States) Logan Erb	(United States) NC State Wolfpack	Houston Dynamo FC	Homegrown player
December 18, 2025	(Haiti) Ricky Louis	(United States) Georgia Southern Eagles	FC Dallas	SuperDraft
December 18, 2025	(Canada) Nikola Marković	(United States) NC State Wolfpack	D.C. United	SuperDraft
December 18, 2025	(United States) Reese Miller	(United States) Virginia Cavaliers	Houston Dynamo FC	Homegrown player
December 18, 2025	(Canada) Jayden Nelson	Vancouver Whitecaps FC	Austin FC	Trade
December 18, 2025	(United States) Kieran Sargeant	Houston Dynamo FC	San Diego FC	Trade
December 18, 2025	(Jamaica) Nicholas Simmonds	(United States) Virginia Cavaliers	FC Dallas	SuperDraft
December 19, 2025	(United States) Femi Awodesu	Houston Dynamo FC	(Sweden) Helsingborgs	Free
December 19, 2025	(United States) Wilson Eisner	San Jose Earthquakes	San Diego FC	End of Year Waivers
December 19, 2025	(Haiti) Carl Sainté	FC Dallas	(United States) El Paso Locomotive	Free
December 22, 2025	(United States) Kamran Acito	(United States) Duke Blue Devils	New York City FC	Homegrown player
December 22, 2025	(United States) Brandon Bye	New England Revolution	Portland Timbers	Free
December 22, 2025	(United States) Cooper Flax	(United States) Wake Forest Demon Deacons	New York City FC	Homegrown player
December 22, 2025	(United States) Sean Nealis	New York Red Bulls	D.C. United	Trade
December 23, 2025	(Argentina) Lucas Hoyos	(Argentina) Newell's Old Boys	Atlanta United FC	Free
December 23, 2025	(United States) Sean Johnson	Toronto FC	D.C. United	Free
December 23, 2025	(United States) Brooklyn Raines	Houston Dynamo FC	New England Revolution	Trade
December 23, 2025	(Honduras) Joseph Rosales	Minnesota United FC	Austin FC	Trade
December 23, 2025	(Trinidad and Tobago) Dante Sealy	CF Montréal	Colorado Rapids	Trade
December 24, 2025	(Sweden) Rasmus Alm	St. Louis City SC	(Sweden) Örgryte	Free
December 24, 2025	(England) Samuel Shashoua	Minnesota United FC	(United States) Birmingham Legion FC	Free
December 26, 2025	(Argentina) Tomás Chancalay	New England Revolution	Minnesota United FC	Trade
December 26, 2025	(Finland) Robin Lod	Minnesota United FC	Chicago Fire FC	Free
December 28, 2025	(United States) Erik Dueñas	Houston Dynamo FC	(Mexico) Querétaro	Free
December 29, 2025	(United States) Drake Callender	Charlotte FC	Minnesota United FC	Trade
December 29, 2025	(United States) Justin Haak	New York City FC	LA Galaxy	Free
December 29, 2025	(Canada) Jacob Shaffelburg	Nashville SC	Los Angeles FC	Trade
December 30, 2025	(Peru) Pedro Gallese	Orlando City SC	(Colombia) Deportivo Cali	Free
December 30, 2025	(United States) Justin Reynolds	Chicago Fire FC	Sporting Kansas City	Trade
December 30, 2025	(Germany) Oliver Semmle	Philadelphia Union	(United States) Lexington SC	Free
December 30, 2025	(United States) Finn Sundstrom	(United States) North Carolina FC	Philadelphia Union	Transfer
December 31, 2025	(Cameroon) Daouda Amadou	Colorado Rapids	(Sweden) Helsingborgs	Free
December 31, 2025	(United States) Josh Cohen	Atlanta United FC	Chicago Fire FC	Free
January 1, 2026	(Brazil) Felipe Andrade	(Brazil) Fluminense	Houston Dynamo FC	Transfer
January 1, 2026	(Argentina) Álvaro Barreal	FC Cincinnati	(Brazil) Santos	Transfer
January 1, 2026	(Argentina) Nehuén Benedetti	(Argentina) Estudiantes	New York Red Bulls	Transfer
January 1, 2026	(Belgium) Christian Benteke	D.C. United	(United Arab Emirates) Al Wahda	Free
January 1, 2026	(Spain) Pep Biel	(Greece) Olympiacos	Charlotte FC	Transfer
January 1, 2026	(Ghana) Osman Bukari	Austin FC	(Poland) Widzew Łódź	Transfer
January 1, 2026	(Canada) Mathieu Choinière	(Switzerland) Grasshopper	Los Angeles FC	Transfer
January 1, 2026	(Canada) Theo Corbeanu	(Spain) Granada	Toronto FC	Transfer
January 1, 2026	(United States) Riley Dalgado	(United States) Ventura County FC	LA Galaxy	Homegrown player
January 1, 2026	(Argentina) Rodrigo De Paul	(Spain) Atlético Madrid	Inter Miami CF	Transfer
January 1, 2026	(Argentina) Franco Escobar	Houston Dynamo FC	(Uruguay) Peñarol	Free
January 1, 2026	(Portugal) André Franco	(Portugal) Porto	Chicago Fire FC	Transfer
January 1, 2026	(United States) Brian Gutiérrez	Chicago Fire FC	(Mexico) Guadalajara	Transfer
January 1, 2026	(Trinidad and Tobago) Kobi Henry	(France) Stade de Reims	Real Salt Lake	Transfer
January 1, 2026	(Australia) Lucas Herrington	(Australia) Brisbane Roar	Colorado Rapids	Transfer
January 1, 2026	(Morocco) Ayoub Jabbari	(France) Grenoble	FC Cincinnati	Transfer
January 1, 2026	(United States) Sawyer Jura	(United States) Portland Timbers 2	Portland Timbers	Homegrown player
January 1, 2026	(Canada) Stefan Kapor	(Canada) Toronto FC II	Toronto FC	Homegrown player
January 1, 2026	(Greece) Georgios Koutsias	Chicago Fire FC	(Switzerland) Lugano	Transfer
January 1, 2026	(United States) Danny Leyva	Seattle Sounders FC	(Mexico) Necaxa	Transfer
January 1, 2026	(United States) Kaiden Moore	(United States) Atlanta United 2	Atlanta United	Homegrown player
January 1, 2026	(Bosnia and Herzegovina) Selmir Pidro	St. Louis City SC	(Bosnia and Herzegovina) Velež Mostar	Free
January 1, 2026	(United States) Rohan Rajagopal	(United States) The Town FC	San Jose Earthquakes	Homegrown player
January 1, 2026	(Mexico) Diego Rocío	(United States) Real Monarchs	Real Salt Lake	Homegrown player
January 1, 2026	(Argentina) Rodrigo Schlegel	Orlando City SC	(Mexico) Atlas	Transfer
January 1, 2026	(United States) Tobias Szewczyk	(United States) New York Red Bulls II	New York Red Bulls	Homegrown player
January 1, 2026	(Finland) Onni Valakari	(Cyprus) Pafos	San Diego FC	Transfer
January 2, 2026	(Paraguay) Braian Ojeda	Real Salt Lake	Orlando City SC	Trade
January 2, 2026	(Germany) Kai Wagner	Philadelphia Union	(England) Birmingham City	Transfer
January 2, 2026	(United States) Walker Zimmerman	Nashville SC	Toronto FC	Free
January 3, 2026	(Paraguay) Carlos Coronel	New York Red Bulls	(Brazil) São Paulo	Free
January 3, 2026	(Argentina) Facundo Mura	(Argentina) Racing Club	Inter Miami CF	Free
January 4, 2026	(Canada) Ali Ahmed	Vancouver Whitecaps FC	(England) Norwich City	Transfer
January 4, 2026	(Canada) Emil Gazdov	CF Montréal	(Germany) FC St. Pauli	Loan
January 4, 2026	(Canada) Dayne St. Clair	Minnesota United FC	Inter Miami CF	Free
January 4, 2026	(United States) Gabriel Segal	Houston Dynamo FC	D.C. United	Re-Entry Draft Stage 2
January 4, 2026	(Brazil) Júnior Urso	Houston Dynamo FC	(Brazil) São Bernardo	Free
January 5, 2026	(Mexico) Ademar Chávez	(United States) FC Cincinnati 2	FC Cincinnati	Homegrown player
January 5, 2026	(United States) Jaidyn Contreras	(United States) North Texas SC	FC Dallas	Homegrown player
January 5, 2026	(United States) Kaka Scabin	(United States) North Texas SC	FC Dallas	Homegrown player
January 5, 2026	(United States) Slade Starnes	(United States) SMU Mustangs	FC Dallas	Homegrown player
January 5, 2026	(United States) Caleb Swann	(United States) North Texas SC	FC Dallas	Homegrown player
January 6, 2026	(Colombia) Fernando Álvarez	CF Montréal	(Colombia) Deportivo Cali	Free
January 6, 2026	(United States) Chance Cowell	San Jose Earthquakes	Real Salt Lake	Trade
January 6, 2026	(Canada) Maxime Crépeau	Portland Timbers	Orlando City SC	Free
January 6, 2026	(Jamaica) Kevon Lambert	Real Salt Lake	(United States) Louisville City FC	Free
January 6, 2026	(Canada) Félix Samson	CF Montréal	FC Cincinnati	Loan
January 6, 2026	(Jamaica) Tarik Scott	FC Dallas	(United States) Lexington SC	Free
January 6, 2026	(United States) Travian Sousa	Seattle Sounders FC	(Denmark) AB	Free
January 7, 2026	(United States) Chase Adams	(United States) Columbus Crew 2	Columbus Crew	Homegrown player
January 7, 2026	(Norway) Heine Gikling Bruseth	San Diego FC	(Norway) Kristiansund	Free
January 7, 2026	(United States) Quinton Elliot	(United States) Columbus Crew 2	Columbus Crew	Homegrown player
January 7, 2026	(Jamaica) Ashton Gordon	Atlanta United FC	(United States) Chattanooga FC	Loan
January 7, 2026	(United States) Isaiah LeFlore	Philadelphia Union	Nashville SC	Trade
January 7, 2026	(Ghana) Shak Mohammed	Orlando City SC	Nashville SC	Trade
January 7, 2026	(Venezuela) Josef Martínez	San Jose Earthquakes	(Mexico) Tijuana	Free
January 7, 2026	(Paraguay) Cristhian Paredes	Portland Timbers	(Paraguay) Cerro Porteño	Free
January 7, 2026	(United States) Owen Presthus	(United States) Columbus Crew 2	Columbus Crew	Homegrown player
January 7, 2026	(United States) Kyle Smith	Orlando City SC	FC Cincinnati	Free
January 8, 2026	(Brazil) Leo Afonso	Atlanta United FC	(United States) Rhode Island FC	Free
January 8, 2026	(United States) Cabral Carter	(United States) Los Angeles FC 2	Los Angeles FC	Free
January 8, 2026	(Guatemala) Matt Evans	(United States) Los Angeles FC 2	Los Angeles FC	Homegrown player
January 8, 2026	(Serbia) Nikola Petković	Charlotte FC	Seattle Sounders FC	Loan
January 8, 2026	(Colombia) Nicolás Rodríguez	Orlando City SC	(Colombia) Atlético Nacional	Loan
January 8, 2026	(Poland) Bartosz Slisz	Atlanta United FC	(Denmark) Brøndby	Transfer
January 8, 2026	(New Zealand) Bill Tuiloma	Charlotte FC	(New Zealand) Wellington Phoenix	Free
January 8, 2026	(Denmark) Mikael Uhre	Philadelphia Union	(Denmark) Midtjylland	Free
January 9, 2026	(Argentina) David Ayala	Portland Timbers	Inter Miami CF	Trade
January 9, 2026	(Cameroon) Boris Enow	D.C. United	(Israel) Beitar Jerusalem	Transfer
January 9, 2026	(Argentina) Cristian Espinoza	San Jose Earthquakes	Nashville SC	Free
January 9, 2026	(United States) Griffin Dillon	(United States) Real Monarchs	Real Salt Lake	Homegrown player
January 9, 2026	(Sierra Leone) Isaiah Jones	Nashville SC	(United States) Chattanooga FC	Loan
January 9, 2026	(United States) Kipp Keller	Minnesota United FC	(United States) New Mexico United	Free
January 9, 2026	(United States) Mac Learned	(United States) New York City FC II	New York City FC	Free
January 9, 2026	(United States) Christina Olivares	St. Louis City SC	(United States) Sporting Club Jacksonville	Loan
January 9, 2026	(United States) Luke Pruter	(United States) Columbus Crew 2	Columbus Crew	Free
January 9, 2026	(Mexico) Daniel Ríos	(Mexico) Guadalajara	CF Montréal	Free
January 9, 2026	(Chile) Antonio Riquelme	(United States) Real Monarchs	Real Salt Lake	Homegrown player
January 9, 2026	(United States) Zach Zengue	(United States) Georgetown Hoyas	Columbus Crew	Free
January 10, 2026	(United States) Leo Burney	Seattle Sounders FC	(Republic of Ireland) Drogheda United	Free
January 11, 2026	(Argentina) Luca Orellano	FC Cincinnati	(Mexico) Monterrey	Transfer
January 12, 2026	(United States) Tom Barlow	Chicago Fire FC	FC Cincinnati	Free
January 12, 2026	(Spain) Miguel Berry	LA Galaxy	(United States) Charleston Battery	Free
January 12, 2026	(Uruguay) Matías Cóccaro	CF Montréal	(Argentina) Newell's Old Boys	Free
January 12, 2026	(United States) Nate Crockford	(United States) FC Cincinnati 2	San Jose Earthquakes	Transfer
January 12, 2026	(United States) Nick Scardina	Charlotte FC	(United States) Rhode Island FC	Free
January 12, 2026	(Germany) Robert Voloder	Sporting Kansas City	New York Red Bulls	Free
January 13, 2026	(United States) Jacob Castro	Seattle Sounders FC	(United States) Rhode Island FC	Free
January 13, 2026	(United States) Daniel Edelman	New York Red Bulls	St. Louis City SC	Trade
January 13, 2026	(United States) Kristian Fletcher	D.C. United	FC Cincinnati	Trade
January 13, 2026	(United States) Sebastian Gomez	(United States) Tacoma Defiance	Seattle Sounders FC	Homegrown player
January 13, 2026	(Japan) Yu Tsukanome	(United States) Tacoma Defiance	Seattle Sounders FC	Free
January 14, 2026	(United States) Tyler Boyd	Nashville SC	Los Angeles FC	Waivers
January 14, 2026	(Mexico) Héctor Herrera	(Mexico) Toluca	Houston Dynamo FC	Free
January 14, 2026	(United States) Cristiano Oliveira	(United States) New England Revolution II	New England Revolution	Homegrown player
January 14, 2026	(United States) Mason Toye	Sporting Kansas City	(Germany) FC Ingolstadt 04	Free
January 15, 2026	(England) Calvin Harris	Colorado Rapids	Sporting Kansas City	Free
January 15, 2026	(United States) Oliver Larraz	Colorado Rapids	Vancouver Whitecaps FC	Free
January 15, 2026	(Chile) Favian Loyola	Orlando City SC	(Chile) Audax Italiano	Free
January 15, 2026	(Colombia) Luis Muriel	Orlando City SC	(Colombia) Atlético Junior	Transfer
January 15, 2026	(Austria) David Schnegg	D.C. United	Charlotte FC	Waivers
January 15, 2026	(Spain) Sergi Solans	(United States) UCLA Bruins	Real Salt Lake	Free
January 15, 2026	(United States) Paul Walters	FC Cincinnati	(Republic of Ireland) Bohemian Football Club	Loan
January 16, 2026	(United States) Kellyn Acosta	Chicago Fire FC	(Poland) Pogoń Szczecin	Free
January 16, 2026	(United States) Kayne Rizvanovich	(United States) Minnesota United FC 2	Minnesota United FC	Homegrown player
January 16, 2026	(United States) Harvey Sarajian	(United States) Wake Forest Demon Deacons	Orlando City SC	SuperDraft
January 16, 2026	(United States) William Yarbrough	Inter Miami CF	Toronto FC	Free
January 17, 2026	(Slovenia) Mitja Ilenič	New York City FC	(Poland) Raków Częstochowa	Loan
January 18, 2026	(Argentina) Tadeo Allende	(Spain) Celta Vigo	Inter Miami CF	Transfer
January 19, 2026	(United States) Prince Amponsah	New York City FC	(Canada) Whitecaps FC 2	Free
January 20, 2026	(Honduras) Exon Arzú	Houston Dynamo FC	(Honduras) Real España	Loan
January 20, 2026	(United States) Bryan Dowd	Chicago Fire FC	(United States) FC Cincinnati 2	Free
January 20, 2026	(South Korea) Kim Jun-hong	D.C. United	(South Korea) Suwon Samsung Bluewings	Loan
January 20, 2026	(Colombia) Edwin Mosquera	Atlanta United FC	(Colombia) Santa Fe	Transfer
January 20, 2026	(Italy) Raoul Petretta	Toronto FC	(Germany) Darmstadt 98	Free
January 20, 2026	(Norway) Conrad Wallem	(Czech Republic) Slavia Prague	St. Louis City SC	Transfer
January 21, 2026	(Canada) Alessandro Biello	CF Montréal	(Canada) Supra du Québec	Free
January 21, 2026	(United States) Stas Korzeniowski	(United States) Philadelphia Union II	Philadelphia Union	Free
January 21, 2026	(United States) Cruz Medina	San Jose Earthquakes	(Mexico) Guadalajara	Loan
January 21, 2026	(United States) Kaiden Moore	Atlanta United FC	Philadelphia Union	Loan
January 21, 2026	(United States) Daniel Pinter	(United States) Inter Miami CF II	Inter Miami CF	Homegrown player
January 22, 2026	(Argentina) Rocco Ríos Novo	(Argentina) Lanús	Inter Miami CF	Transfer
January 22, 2026	(United States) Neil Pierre	Philadelphia Union	(Denmark) Lyngby	Loan
January 22, 2026	(Norway) Sigurd Rosted	Toronto FC	(Norway) Sarpsborg 08	Free
January 22, 2026	(United States) Brian Schaefer	(United States) FC Cincinnati 2	FC Cincinnati	Free
January 22, 2026	(United States) Brian Schaefer	FC Cincinnati	(United States) Tampa Bay Rowdies	Loan
January 22, 2026	(United States) Tommy Silva	Real Salt Lake	(United States) Detroit City FC	Free
January 23, 2026	(Argentina) Tomás Avilés	Inter Miami CF	CF Montréal	Loan
January 23, 2026	(United States) Luis Barraza	D.C. United	Inter Miami CF	Free
January 23, 2026	(England) Toyosi Olusanya	Houston Dynamo FC	(Scotland) Aberdeen	Loan
January 23, 2026	(Saint Lucia) Donavan Phillip	(United States) NC State Wolfpack	Colorado Rapids	SuperDraft
January 23, 2026	(United States) Santiago Suárez	New England Revolution	(United States) San Antonio FC	Loan
January 24, 2026	(Romania) Enes Sali	FC Dallas	(Saudi Arabia) Al-Riyadh	Loan
January 26, 2026	(Nigeria) William Agada	Real Salt Lake	(Spain) Real Zaragoza	Free
January 26, 2026	(Ghana) Ezekiel Alladoh	(Sweden) Brommapojkarna	Philadelphia Union	Transfer
January 26, 2026	(Guinea) Sekou Bangoura	(Israel) Kiryat Shmona	Columbus Crew	Transfer
January 26, 2026	(Israel) Ran Binyamin	(Israel) Hapoel Tel Aviv	FC Dallas	Transfer
January 26, 2026	(Australia) Alex Bonetig	(Australia) Western Sydney Wanderers	Portland Timbers	Transfer
January 26, 2026	(United States) Alex Bono	New England Revolution	D.C. United	Trade
January 26, 2026	(United States) Zach Booth	(Netherlands) Excelsior	Real Salt Lake	Loan
January 26, 2026	(Sweden) Amin Boudri	(Sweden) GAIS	Los Angeles FC	Transfer
January 26, 2026	(Argentina) Agustín Bouzat	(Argentina) Vélez Sarsfield	Houston Dynamo FC	Transfer
January 26, 2026	(United States) Justin Che	(Denmark) Brøndby	New York Red Bulls	Transfer
January 26, 2026	(United States) Cade Cowell	(Mexico) Guadalajara	New York Red Bulls	Loan
January 26, 2026	(United States) Luca de la Torre	(Spain) Celta de Vigo	Charlotte FC	Transfer
January 26, 2026	(South Africa) Puso Dithejane	(South Africa) TS Galaxy	Chicago Fire FC	Transfer
January 26, 2026	(United States) Michael Edwards	Colorado Rapids	(United States) Oakland Roots SC	Free
January 26, 2026	(Denmark) Lukas Engel	(England) Middlesbrough	Real Salt Lake	Transfer
January 26, 2026	(Canada) Nicolas Fleuriau Chateau	Vancouver Whitecaps FC	(Republic of Ireland) Galway United	Free
January 26, 2026	(Colombia) Mauricio González	(Colombia) Deportes Tolima	Minnesota United FC	Transfer
January 26, 2026	(Brazil) Guilherme	(Brazil) Santos	Houston Dynamo FC	Transfer
January 26, 2026	(Brazil) Lucas Halter	(Brazil) Botafogo	Houston Dynamo FC	Transfer
January 26, 2026	(Argentina) Tomás Jacob	(Mexico) Necaxa	Atlanta United FC	Transfer
January 26, 2026	(Sweden) Herman Johansson	(Sweden) Mjällby	FC Dallas	Transfer
January 26, 2026	(Indonesia) Ethan Kohler	(Germany) Werder Bremen	New England Revolution	Transfer
January 26, 2026	(Japan) Keisuke Kurokawa	(Japan) Gamba Osaka	D.C. United	Transfer
January 26, 2026	(Denmark) Japhet Sery Larsen	(Norway) Brann	Philadelphia Union	Transfer
January 26, 2026	(Ukraine) Ivan Losenko	(Ukraine) Shakhtar Donetsk	CF Montréal	Loan
January 26, 2026	(Costa Rica) Warren Madrigal	(Costa Rica) Saprissa	Nashville SC	Transfer
January 26, 2026	(United States) Nick Markanich	(Spain) Castellón	Houston Dynamo FC	Loan
January 26, 2026	(South Africa) Mbekezeli Mbokazi	(South Africa) Orlando Pirates	Chicago Fire FC	Transfer
January 26, 2026	(Brazil) Micael	(Brazil) Palmeiras	Inter Miami CF	Loan
January 26, 2026	(United States) Tyler Miller	(England) Bolton Wanderers	Charlotte FC	Transfer
January 26, 2026	(Romania) Louis Munteanu	(Romania) CFR Cluj	D.C. United	Transfer
January 26, 2026	(Nigeria) Hamzat Ojediran	(France) Lens	Colorado Rapids	Transfer
January 26, 2026	(Brazil) Luis Otávio	(Brazil) Internacional	Orlando City SC	Transfer
January 26, 2026	(Brazil) Matheus Pereira	(Portugal) Santa Clara	Toronto FC	Transfer
January 26, 2026	(Ecuador) Bryan Ramírez	(Ecuador) LDU Quito	FC Cincinnati	Transfer
January 26, 2026	(Sweden) Anton Salétros	(Sweden) AIK	Chicago Fire FC	Transfer
January 26, 2026	(Denmark) Osvald Søe	(Denmark) B.93	San Diego FC	Transfer
January 26, 2026	(Netherlands) Stijn Spierings	(Denmark) Brøndby IF	Real Salt Lake	Transfer
January 26, 2026	(Brazil) Tiago	(Brazil) Bahia	Orlando City SC	Transfer
January 26, 2026	(Uruguay) Facundo Torres	(Brazil) Palmeiras	Austin FC	Transfer
January 26, 2026	(Ghana) Maxwell Woledzi	(Norway) Fredrikstad	Nashville SC	Transfer
January 26, 2026	(United States) Griffin Yow	(Belgium) Westerlo	New England Revolution	Transfer
January 27, 2026	(Uruguay) Gastón Brugman	Nashville SC	(Italy) Pescara	Free
January 27, 2026	(Argentina) Julián Fernández	New York City FC	(Argentina) Rosario Central	Loan
January 27, 2026	(United States) Adrian Gill	(Spain) Barcelona	Atlanta United FC	Transfer
January 27, 2026	(Brazil) João Klauss	St. Louis City SC	LA Galaxy	Trade
January 27, 2026	(Argentina) Franco Negri	San Diego FC	Houston Dynamo FC	Free
January 27, 2026	(Senegal) Babacar Niang	Minnesota United FC	(United States) Louisville City FC	Loan
January 27, 2026	(Brazil) Rafael Santos	Colorado Rapids	St. Louis City SC	Free
January 27, 2026	(Australia) Kai Trewin	(Australia) Melbourne City	New York City FC	Transfer
January 28, 2026	(Canada) Marcus Caldeira	(United States) West Virginia Mountaineers	Minnesota United FC	Free
January 28, 2026	(Spain) Joaquín Fernández	Sporting Kansas City	(Spain) Huesca	Free
January 28, 2026	(Poland) Sebastian Kowalczyk	Houston Dynamo FC	(Poland) Zagłębie Lubin	Free
January 28, 2026	(Northern Ireland) Paddy McNair	San Diego FC	(England) Hull City	Transfer
January 28, 2026	(Chile) Marcelo Morales	New York Red Bulls	Universidad de Chile	Loan
January 28, 2026	(Germany) Erik Thommy	Sporting Kansas City	LA Galaxy	Free
January 29, 2026	(Poland) Mateusz Bogusz	(Mexico) Cruz Azul	Houston Dynamo FC	Transfer
January 29, 2026	(Senegal) Mamadou Mbacke Fall	(Spain) Barcelona	St. Louis City SC	Transfer
January 29, 2026	(United States) Alex Freeman	Orlando City SC	(Spain) Villarreal	Transfer
January 29, 2026	(Switzerland) Silvan Hefti	(Germany) Hamburger SV	D.C. United	Transfer
January 29, 2026	(United States) Ethan Horvath	(Wales) Cardiff City	New York Red Bulls	Transfer
January 29, 2026	(United States) Henry Kessler	St. Louis City SC	Charlotte FC	Free
January 29, 2026	(Serbia) Jovan Mijatović	New York City FC	(Germany) Eintracht Braunschweig	Loan
January 29, 2026	(Belgium) Joedrick Pupe	Vancouver Whitecaps FC	(Belgium) Sint-Truidense	Loan
January 29, 2026	(Germany) Timo Werner	(Germany) RB Leipzig	San Jose Earthquakes	Transfer
January 30, 2026	(Mexico) Germán Berterame	(Mexico) Monterrey	Inter Miami CF	Transfer
January 30, 2026	(Ecuador) Bruno Caicedo	(Ecuador) Barcelona SC	Vancouver Whitecaps FC	Transfer
January 30, 2026	(United States) Aziel Jackson	(Poland) Jagiellonia Białystok	Vancouver Whitecaps FC	Loan
January 30, 2026	(United States) Dante Polvara	(Scotland) Aberdeen	St. Louis City SC	Transfer
February 2, 2026	(Colombia) Cristian Arango	San Jose Earthquakes	(Colombia) Atlético Nacional	Loan
February 2, 2026	(Uruguay) César Araújo	Orlando City SC	(Mexico) Tigres UANL	Free
February 2, 2026	(United States) Cole Bassett	Colorado Rapids	Portland Timbers	Trade
February 2, 2026	(Sweden) Noah Eile	New York Red Bulls	(England) Bristol City	Transfer
February 2, 2026	(Indonesia) Maarten Paes	FC Dallas	(Netherlands) Ajax	Transfer
February 2, 2026	(United States) Jack Panayotou	New England Revolution	(United States) Loudoun United FC	Loan
February 2, 2026	(Canada) Van Parker	(United States) Real Salt Lake Academy	Real Salt Lake	Homegrown player
February 2, 2026	(Canada) Jacen Russell-Rowe	Columbus Crew	(France) Toulouse	Transfer
February 2, 2026	(Mexico) Jorge Ruvalcaba	(Mexico) Club Universidad Nacional	New York Red Bulls	Transfer
February 2, 2026	(Canada) Jonathan Sirois	CF Montréal	FC Dallas	Trade
February 2, 2026	(Senegal) Jamal Thiaré	Atlanta United FC	Columbus Crew	Trade
February 2, 2026	(Mexico) Obed Vargas	Seattle Sounders FC	(Spain) Atlético Madrid	Transfer
February 2, 2026	(Canada) Sydney Wathuta	(United States) Colorado Rapids 2	Colorado Rapids	Free
February 3, 2026	(Argentina) Elías Báez	(Argentina) San Lorenzo	Atlanta United FC	Transfer
February 3, 2026	(Australia) Giuseppe Bovalina	Vancouver Whitecaps FC	(Sweden) Örebro SK	Loan
February 3, 2026	(Guinea) Morgan Guilavogui	(France) Lens	Real Salt Lake	Transfer
February 3, 2026	(Slovakia) Matúš Kmeť	Minnesota United FC	(Slovakia) DAC 1904	Loan
February 3, 2026	(Colombia) Geiner Martínez	(Uruguay) Juventud	Philadelphia Union	Transfer
February 3, 2026	(United States) Wyatt Meyer	Nashville SC	Sporting Kansas City	Free
February 3, 2026	(United States) Jayden Reid	St. Louis City SC	Sporting Kansas City	Free
February 4, 2026	(United States) Nolan Miller	(United States) Michigan Wolverines	Orlando City SC	SuperDraft
February 5, 2026	(United States) Adam Beaudry	Colorado Rapids	(United States) Loudoun United FC	Loan
February 5, 2026	(Panama) JD Gunn	(United States) New England Revolution II	New England Revolution	Free
February 5, 2026	(Germany) Alexander Hack	New York Red Bulls	(Switzerland) Zürich	Free
February 5, 2026	(Finland) Lassi Lappalainen	Columbus Crew	(Finland) HJK Helsinki	Free
February 5, 2026	(Senegal) Cheikh Sabaly	(France) FC Metz	Vancouver Whitecaps FC	Transfer
February 6, 2026	(United States) Chris Donovan	Philadelphia Union	(United States) Louisville City	Free
February 6, 2026	(Canada) Stephen Eustáquio	(Portugal) FC Porto	Los Angeles FC	Loan
February 6, 2026	(Canada) Samsy Keita	(Canada) CF Montréal Academy	CF Montréal	Homegrown player
February 6, 2026	(United States) Chituru Odunze	Charlotte FC	(United States) Phoenix Rising FC	Loan
February 6, 2026	(Colombia) James Rodríguez	(Mexico) León	Minnesota United FC	Free
February 6, 2026	(United States) Isaac Walker	(United States) Crown Legacy FC	Charlotte FC	Free
February 7, 2026	(Brazil) Iago Teodoro	(Brazil) Flamengo	Orlando City SC	Transfer
February 8, 2026	(Denmark) Andreas Maxsø	Colorado Rapids	(United Arab Emirates) Kalba	Free
February 9, 2026	(Colombia) Juan José Arias	(Colombia) Atlético Nacional	Real Salt Lake	Loan
February 9, 2026	(Venezuela) Wikelman Carmona	New York Red Bulls	CF Montréal	Trade
February 9, 2026	(United States) Bryce Duke	CF Montréal	San Diego FC	Free
February 9, 2026	(Canada) Jahkeele Marshall-Rutty	CF Montréal	New York Red Bulls	Trade
February 9, 2026	(Switzerland) Noah Streit	(Switzerland) Basel	CF Montréal	Transfer
February 10, 2026	(Azerbaijan) Nariman Akhundzade	(Azerbaijan) Qarabağ	Columbus Crew	Transfer
February 10, 2026	(United States) Agustin Anello	(Uruguay) Boston River	Philadelphia Union	Transfer
February 10, 2026	(Poland) Wiktor Bogacz	New York Red Bulls	(Poland) Cracovia	Loan
February 10, 2026	(Canada) Lukas MacNaughton	D.C. United	St. Louis City SC	Free
February 10, 2026	(United States) Jonathan Pérez	Nashville SC	(Mexico) Guadalajara	Transfer
February 10, 2026	(Uruguay) Juan Manuel Sanabria	(Mexico) Atlético de San Luis	Real Salt Lake	Transfer
February 10, 2026	(United States) Adem Sipić	Nashville SC	(Germany) Eintracht Braunschweig	Loan
February 13, 2026	(United States) Kyle Duncan	New York Red Bulls	Minnesota United FC	Free
February 13, 2026	(United States) Zack Farnsworth	Real Salt Lake	(United States) Monterey Bay FC	Free
February 13, 2026	(Uruguay) Joaquín Valiente	(Uruguay) Defensor Sporting	FC Dallas	Transfer
February 13, 2026	(Costa Rica) Gino Vivi	LA Galaxy	(United States) Tampa Bay Rowdies	Loan
February 13, 2026	(United States) Sam Williams	Chicago Fire FC	(United States) Colorado Springs Switchbacks FC	Loan
February 16, 2026	(United States) Brooks Thompson	(United States) Lexington SC	FC Dallas	Loan
February 17, 2026	(Colombia) Emilio Aristizábal	(Colombia) Atlético Nacional	Toronto FC	Loan
February 17, 2026	(Canada) Raheem Edwards	New York Red Bulls	Toronto FC	Waivers
February 17, 2026	(Venezuela) Miguel Navarro	(Argentina) Talleres	Colorado Rapids	Loan
February 17, 2026	(Haiti) Fafà Picault	Inter Miami CF	Atlanta United FC	Free
February 18, 2026	(United States) Reed Baker-Whiting	Seattle Sounders FC	Nashville SC	Trade
February 18, 2026	(United States) Griffin Dorsey	Houston Dynamo FC	Orlando City SC	Trade
February 18, 2026	(Guyana) Omari Glasgow	Chicago Fire FC	(United States) Monterey Bay FC	Loan
February 18, 2026	(Norway) Lasse Berg Johnsen	(Sweden) Malmö FF	Sporting Kansas City	Transfer
February 18, 2026	(Jamaica) Malachi Molina	FC Dallas	Nashville SC	Loan
February 18, 2026	(Jamaica) Malachi Molina	Nashville SC	(United States) Huntsville City FC	Loan
February 18, 2026	(Brazil) Sérgio Santos	Houston Dynamo FC	Atlanta United FC	Free
February 19, 2026	(United States) Taylor Calheira	(United States) FC Tulsa	Sporting Kansas City	Transfer
February 19, 2026	(United States) Will Cleary	(United States) Stanford Cardinal	Charlotte FC	SuperDraft
February 19, 2026	(Portugal) André Gomes	(France) Lille	Columbus Crew	Free
February 19, 2026	(United States) Jack Jasinski	(United States) Princeton Tigers	San Jose Earthquakes	SuperDraft
February 19, 2026	(United States) Andrew Johnson	(United States) Cornell Big Red	Charlotte FC	Free
February 19, 2026	(Hungary) Dániel Sallói	Sporting Kansas City	Toronto FC	Trade
February 19, 2026	(Ivory Coast) Bryan Zamblé	(Ghana) Right to Dream Academy	San Diego FC	Free
February 20, 2026	(Nigeria) Nonso Adimabua	(United States) San Jose Earthquakes II	San Jose Earthquakes	Free
February 20, 2026	(United States) Ethan Bartlow	Houston Dynamo FC	Sporting Kansas City	Free
February 20, 2026	(United States) Justin Ellis	(United States) Orlando City B	Orlando City SC	Homegrown player
February 20, 2026	(Mexico) Jonathan González	(Mexico) Juárez	San Jose Earthquakes	Transfer
February 20, 2026	(Canada) Mark-Anthony Kaye	San Jose Earthquakes	(United States) Sacramento Republic FC	Free
February 20, 2026	(United States) Kevin Pierre	(United States) Georgia Southern Eagles	New York City FC	SuperDraft
February 21, 2026	(United States) Matthew Arana	(United States) Houston Dynamo Academy	Houston Dynamo FC	Homegrown player
February 24, 2026	(Venezuela) Sergio Córdova	(Switzerland) Young Boys	St. Louis City SC	Loan
February 24, 2026	(Haiti) Nelson Pierre	Vancouver Whitecaps FC	(United States) FC Tulsa	Loan
February 25, 2026	(Chile) Alexander Aravena	(Brazil) Grêmio	Portland Timbers	Loan
February 25, 2026	(Haiti) Grant Leveille	(United States) D.C. United Academy	D.C. United	Homegrown player
February 26, 2026	(Belgium) Joyeux Masanka Bungi	(Germany) RB Leipzig	New York Red Bulls	Loan
February 26, 2026	(United States) Mark O'Neill	Vancouver Whitecaps FC	(United States) Tacoma Defiance	Free
February 27, 2026	(United States) Markus Anderson	Philadelphia Union	(United States) Brooklyn FC	Loan
February 27, 2026	(Colombia) Tomás Ángel	San Diego FC	(Colombia) América de Cali	Transfer
February 27, 2026	(Republic of the Congo) Philippe Ndinga	(Sweden) Degerfors	Philadelphia Union	Transfer
February 27, 2026	(United States) Christian Ramirez	LA Galaxy	Austin FC	Waivers
February 27, 2026	(United States) Josh Sargent	(England) Norwich City	Toronto FC	Transfer
March 2, 2026	(Paraguay) Matías Galarza	(Argentina) River Plate	Atlanta United FC	Loan
March 5, 2026	(Chile) Benjamín Kuscevic	(Brazil) Fortaleza	Toronto FC	Loan
March 5, 2026	(Poland) Fabian Mrozek	(England) Liverpool	FC Cincinnati	Loan
March 6, 2026	(United States) Matthew Dos Santos	(United States) New York Red Bulls II	New York Red Bulls	Homegrown player
March 6, 2026	(United States) Serge Ngoma	New York Red Bulls	(United States) Birmingham Legion FC	Loan
March 12, 2026	(Nigeria) Ibrahim Aliyu	Columbus Crew	Houston Dynamo FC	Trade
March 12, 2026	(Colombia) José Caicedo	(Mexico) Club Universidad Nacional	Portland Timbers	Transfer
March 13, 2026	(Angola) Capita	(Poland) Radomiak Radom	Sporting Kansas City	Transfer
March 13, 2026	(Uruguay) Diego Fagúndez	LA Galaxy	New England Revolution	Free
March 17, 2026	(Brazil) Diego Borges	(Hungary) Zalaegerszegi	Sporting Kansas City	Transfer
March 17, 2026	(United States) Antino Lopez	(United States) Tacoma Defiance	Seattle Sounders FC	Free
March 20, 2026	(Argentina) Agustin Resch	(United States) Houston Dynamo 2	Houston Dynamo FC	Free
March 20, 2026	(United States) Alexander Shaw	(United States) Inter Miami CF II	Inter Miami CF	Homegrown player
March 20, 2026	(United States) Sam Vines	Colorado Rapids	Houston Dynamo FC	Free
March 23, 2026	(United States) Christian Diaz	(United States) Los Angeles FC 2	Los Angeles FC	Homegrown player
March 23, 2026	(Canada) Adam Pearlman	Toronto FC	(Canada) Cavalry FC	Loan
March 26, 2026	(Colombia) Julián Bazán	(Colombia) Deportivo Pereira	New York Red Bulls	Transfer
March 26, 2026	(Canada) Kosi Thompson	Toronto FC	Colorado Rapids	Trade
March 27, 2026	(Burkina Faso) Georgi Minoungou	Seattle Sounders FC	Colorado Rapids	Trade
March 27, 2026	(Colombia) Santiago Moreno	(Brazil) Fluminense	FC Dallas	Loan
March 27, 2026	(United States) Marcos Zambrano	Real Salt Lake	New England Revolution	Loan
April 2, 2026	(United States) Frankie Amaya	(Mexico) Toluca	CF Montréal	Loan
April 2, 2026	(United States) Andrei Chirila	(United States) FC Cincinnati 2	FC Cincinnati	Homegrown player
April 2, 2026	(United States) Malik Jakupovic	(United States) Philadelphia Union II	Philadelphia Union	Homegrown player
April 3, 2026	(United States) Peter Kingston	(United States) Tacoma Defiance	Seattle Sounders FC	Free
April 10, 2026	(Benin) Rodolfo Aloko	(United States) Crown Legacy FC	Charlotte FC	Free
April 21, 2026	(United States) Aron John	(United States) Crown Legacy FC	Charlotte FC	Homegrown player
April 25, 2026	(Spain) Arnau Farnós	(United States) New York City FC II	New York City FC	Free
May 13, 2026	(United States) Preston Plambeck	(United States) Inter Miami CF II	Inter Miami CF	Homegrown player
May 19, 2026	(Grenada) Darius Johnson	(United States) Phoenix Rising FC	San Jose Earthquakes	Transfer
June 2, 2026	(Israel) Or Blorian	(Israel) Hapoel Be'er Sheva	Sporting Kansas City	Free
June 3, 2026	(Chile) Zidane Yáñez	New York City FC	(United States) Huntsville City FC	Loan
June 5, 2026	(United States) Jordan Farr	D.C. United	(United States) Loudoun United FC	Loan
June 9, 2026	(United States) Brooks Lennon	Atlanta United FC	Columbus Crew	Free
June 23, 2026	(Belgium) Joedrick Pupe	Vancouver Whitecaps FC	(Belgium) STVV	Transfer
June 27, 2026	(United States) Benjamin Cremaschi	Inter Miami CF	(Italy) Parma	Transfer
July 1, 2026	(United States) Mauricio Cuevas	LA Galaxy	(Mexico) Santos Laguna	Transfer
July 1, 2026	(England) Andre Dozzell	(England) Portsmouth	D.C. United	Free
July 1, 2026	(United States) Blake Gillingham	Houston Dynamo FC	El Paso Locomotive FC	Loan
July 1, 2026	(United States) Wilson Harris	(Israel) Maccabi Netanya	New England Revolution	Free
July 1, 2026	(Argentina) Andrés Herrera	(Argentina) River Plate	Columbus Crew	Transfer
July 1, 2026	(Ghana) Kwadwo Opoku	CF Montréal	(Greece) Panetolikos	Transfer
July 1, 2026	(Poland) Przemysław Płacheta	(England) Oxford United	Austin FC	Free
July 1, 2026	(Republic of Ireland) Connor Ronan	Colorado Rapids	(Scotland) Aberdeen	Transfer
July 1, 2026	(Indonesia) Adrian Wibowo	Los Angeles FC	(Austria) FC Wacker Innsbruck	Loan
July 2, 2026	(Slovakia) Matúš Kmeť	Minnesota United FC	(Czech Republic) Baník Ostrava	Transfer
July 3, 2026	(Uruguay) Diego Rossi	Columbus Crew	(Mexico) Monterrey	Transfer
July 4, 2026	(Germany) Sebastian Schonlau	Vancouver Whitecaps FC	(Germany) Holstein Kiel	Free
July 7, 2026	(Brazil) Gabriel Pec	LA Galaxy	(Brazil) Cruzeiro	Transfer
July 9, 2026	(Guatemala) Matt Evans	Los Angeles FC	(Austria) FC Wacker Innsbruck	Loan
July 13, 2026	(Paraguay) Júnior Alonso	(Brazil) Atlético Mineiro	Atlanta United FC	Free
July 13, 2026	(Ukraine) Yevhen Cheberko	Columbus Crew	Los Angeles FC	Trade
July 13, 2026	(Brazil) Daniel	San Jose Earthquakes	FC Dallas	Trade
July 13, 2026	(Argentina) Lautaro Giaccone	(Argentina) Argentinos Juniors	Columbus Crew	Loan
July 13, 2026	(France) Antoine Griezmann	(Spain) Atlético Madrid	Orlando City SC	Free
July 13, 2026	(Scotland) Angus Gunn	(England) Nottingham Forest	San Jose Earthquakes	Free
July 13, 2026	(Bosnia and Herzegovina) Emir Karić	(Austria) Sturm Graz	Sporting Kansas City	Transfer
July 13, 2026	(Poland) Robert Lewandowski	(Spain) Barcelona	Chicago Fire FC	Free
July 13, 2026	(Georgia (country)) Saba Lobjanidze	Atlanta United FC	Real Salt Lake	Trade
July 13, 2026	(United States) Duncan McGuire	Orlando City SC	Houston Dynamo FC	Trade
July 13, 2026	(Spain) Brais Méndez	(Spain) Real Sociedad	Columbus Crew	Transfer
July 13, 2026	(Colombia) Moisés Mosquera	(Mexico) Juárez	Sporting Kansas City	Transfer
July 13, 2026	(United States) Ian Murphy	Colorado Rapids	San Diego FC	Trade
July 13, 2026	(El Salvador) Nathan Ordaz	Los Angeles FC	D.C. United	Trade
July 13, 2026	(Colombia) Nelson Palacio	Real Salt Lake	Toronto FC	Trade
July 13, 2026	(Venezuela) Daniel Pereira	Austin FC	CF Montréal	Trade
July 13, 2026	(Brazil) Gabriel Pirani	D.C. United	San Diego FC	Trade
July 13, 2026	(France) Allan Saint-Maximin	(France) Lens	Charlotte FC	Free
July 13, 2026	(Ivory Coast) Bénie Traoré	(Switzerland) Basel	New York City FC	Transfer
July 13, 2026	(United States) Matt Turner	(France) Lyon	New England Revolution	Loan
July 13, 2026	(Spain) Loïc Williams	(Spain) Granada	Colorado Rapids	Transfer
July 13, 2026	(United States) Zach Zengue	Columbus Crew	St. Louis City SC	Loan
July 14, 2026	(Ecuador) Fricio Caicedo	(Costa Rica) FC Moravia FCM	Inter Miami CF	Loan
July 14, 2026	(Chile) Paulo Díaz	(Argentina) River Plate	Atlanta United FC	Free
July 15, 2026	(United States) Palmer Ault	St. Louis City 2	St. Louis City SC	Free
July 15, 2026	(United States) Cody Baker	Seattle Sounders FC	New England Revolution	Loan
July 15, 2026	(Australia) Jake Girdwood-Reich	St. Louis City SC	(Scotland) Motherwell	Free
July 15, 2026	(Finland) Robert Taylor	Austin FC	LA Galaxy	Free
July 16, 2026	(Argentina) Tomás Avilés	Inter Miami CF	(Chile) O'Higgins	Loan
July 16, 2026	(Canada) Richard Chukwu	(Canada) Toronto FC II	Toronto FC	Homegrown player
July 16, 2026	(United States) Malcolm Fry	New England Revolution	(United States) Lexington SC	Loan
July 16, 2026	(United States) Tristan Himes	(United States) Orlando City B	Orlando City SC	Homegrown player
July 16, 2026	(Australia) Luka Jovanović	(Australia) Adelaide United	San Jose Earthquakes	Transfer
July 16, 2026	(Tunisia) Elias Saad	(Germany) FC Augsburg	Nashville SC	Loan
July 17, 2026	(Canada) Clovis Archange	(United States) Orlando City B	Orlando City SC	Homegrown player
July 17, 2026	(Ivory Coast) Eric Bailly	(Spain) Real Oviedo	Columbus Crew	Free
July 17, 2026	(United States) Daryl Dike	(England) West Bromwich Albion	Orlando City SC	Free
July 17, 2026	(Germany) Kai Wagner	(England) Birmingham City	Philadelphia Union	Transfer
July 20, 2026	(Spain) Jesús Barea	Real Salt Lake	(United States) AC Boise	Loan
July 20, 2026	(Chile) Zidane Yáñez	New York City FC	Nashville SC	Trade
July 21, 2026	(Japan) Kyōgo Furuhashi	(England) Birmingham City	LA Galaxy	Transfer
July 21, 2026	(Romania) Alexandru Mățan	(Greece) Panetolikos	St. Louis City SC	Free
July 21, 2026	(United States) Adem Sipić	Nashville SC	(Sweden) Gefle IF	Loan
July 22, 2026	(Sweden) Amin Boudri	Los Angeles FC	(Sweden) Hammarby	Transfer
July 22, 2026	(Brazil) Casemiro	(England) Manchester United	Inter Miami CF	Free
July 22, 2026	(United States) Daniel Sumalla	(United States) Inter Miami CF II	Inter Miami CF	Free
July 23, 2026	(Belgium) Hugo Cuypers	Chicago Fire FC	(Mexico) Monterrey	Transfer
July 23, 2026	(Canada) Aleksandr Guboglo	CF Montréal	(France) Stade de Reims	Loan
July 23, 2026	(United States) Benjamin Flowers	(United States) FC Dallas Academy	FC Dallas	Homegrown player
July 24, 2026	(Tunisia) Elias Achouri	(Denmark) Copenhagen	San Diego FC	Transfer
July 24, 2026	(Denmark) Marcus Alstrup	(United States) Austin FC II	San Diego FC	Free
July 24, 2026	(Colombia) Brayan Ceballos	New England Revolution	CF Montréal	Trade
July 24, 2026	(Paraguay) Gilberto Flores	FC Cincinnati	(Paraguay) Libertad	Loan
July 24, 2026	(Iceland) Dagur Dan Þórhallsson	CF Montréal	San Diego FC	Trade
July 25, 2026	(England) Jack Harrison	(England) Leeds United	New England Revolution	Transfer
July 25, 2026	(United States) Bernardo Rhein	(United States) Orlando City B	Orlando City SC	Homegrown player
July 27, 2026	(Senegal) Famara Camara	(Norway) Ranheim Fotball	Nashville SC	Transfer
July 27, 2026	(United States) Clay Holstad	(United States) Rhode Island FC	FC Dallas	Loan
July 27, 2026	(Costa Rica) Kenyel Michel	Minnesota United FC	(Costa Rica) Liga Deportiva Alajuelense	Loan
July 27, 2026	(Japan) Yu Tsukanome	Seattle Sounders FC	(United States) Pittsburgh Riverhounds SC	Loan
July 28, 2026	(United States) Sebastian Berhalter	Vancouver Whitecaps FC	(England) Middlesbrough	Transfer
July 28, 2026	(Germany) Niklas Dorsch	(Germany) FC Heidenheim	Toronto FC	Transfer
July 28, 2026	(Denmark) Carlo Holse	(Turkey) Samsunspor	St. Louis City SC	Transfer
July 28, 2026	(Brazil) Luighi	(Brazil) Palmeiras	New York City FC	Loan
July 28, 2026	(Ukraine) Artem Smoliakov	Los Angeles FC	(Ukraine) FC Kharkiv	Loan
July 29, 2026	(Honduras) Exon Arzú	Houston Dynamo FC	(Venezuela) Carabobo	Transfer
July 29, 2026	(Netherlands) Vincent Janssen	(Belgium) Royal Antwerp	Portland Timbers	Free
July 29, 2026	(Japan) Kimito Nono	(Japan) Kashima Antlers	D.C. United	Transfer
July 29, 2026	(United States) Aidan Stokes	New York Red Bulls	(England) Brentford	Loan
July 30, 2026	(Portugal) Pedro Amador	Atlanta United FC	(Israel) Hapoel Be'er Sheva	Transfer
July 30, 2026	(Argentina) Nicolás Dubersarsky	Austin FC	(Argentina) Tigre	Loan
July 30, 2026	(United States) Tarun Karumanchi	(United States) Columbus Crew 2	Columbus Crew	Free
July 30, 2026	(South Africa) Olwethu Makhanya	Philadelphia Union	(Scotland) Rangers	Transfer
July 30, 2026	(Chile) Felipe Mora	Portland Timbers	(Mexico) Atlético de San Luis	Transfer
July 30, 2026	(Canada) Kwasi Poku	(Belgium) RWDM Brussels	Vancouver Whitecaps FC	Transfer
July 30, 2026	(Japan) Yutaro Tsukada	Orlando City SC	(United States) Rhode Island FC	Loan
July 31, 2026	(Spain) Jorge Alastuey	(United States) Austin FC II	Austin FC	Free
July 31, 2026	(Dominican Republic) Kamil Castillo	(United States) D.C. United Academy	D.C. United	Homegrown player
July 31, 2026	(France) Youssef Maziz	(Belgium) Oud-Heverelee Leuven	Colorado Rapids	Free
July 31, 2026	(Netherlands) Wessel Speel	Minnesota United FC	(Netherlands) Almere City FC	Loan
July 31, 2026	(United States) Cielo Tschantret	Sporting Kansas City	(United States) Lexington SC	Loan
July 31, 2026	(Colombia) Kerwin Vargas	Charlotte FC	(Brazil) Paranaense	Transfer
August 2, 2026	(Ivory Coast) Emmanuel Latte Lath	Atlanta United FC	(Germany) Union Berlin	Loan
August 3, 2026	(Azerbaijan) Nariman Akhundzada	Columbus Crew	(Turkey) Erzurumspor	Loan
August 4, 2026	(United States) Max Arfsten	Columbus Crew	(England) Middlesbrough	Transfer
August 5, 2026	(Chile) Gonzalo Tapia	(Brazil) São Paulo	Columbus Crew	Loan
August 7, 2026	(Uruguay) Mauricio Amaro	(Uruguay) Defensor Sporting	Atlanta United FC	Transfer
August 7, 2026	(United States) Conner Antley	D.C. United	(United States) Tampa Bay Rowdies	Loan
August 7, 2026	(United States) Eddy Davis III	Philadelphia Union	(United States) Loudoun United FC	Loan
August 7, 2026	(Mexico) Hirving Lozano	San Diego FC	LA Galaxy	Loan
August 7, 2026	(Uganda) Allan Oyirwoth	New England Revolution	(Scotland) Dunfermline Athletic	Loan
August 7, 2026	(Romania) Enes Sali	FC Dallas	(Spain) Andorra	Transfer
August 8, 2026	(United States) Edwin Cerrillo	LA Galaxy	(Mexico) Club América	Transfer
August 8, 2026	(Colombia) Andrés Reyes	San Diego FC	(Colombia) Atlético Nacional	Transfer
August 8, 2026	(Spain) Sergi Roberto	(Italy) Como	LA Galaxy	Free
August 10, 2026	(Brazil) Lineker Rodrigues	(United States) Real Monarchs	Real Salt Lake	Free
August 11, 2026	(United States) Ethan Bartlow	Sporting Kansas City	(United States) Tampa Bay Rowdies	Loan
August 11, 2026	(Germany) Marcel Hartel	St. Louis City SC	(Germany) Hannover 96	Transfer
August 11, 2026	(Chile) Alexis Sánchez	(Spain) Sevilla	CF Montréal	Free
August 11, 2026	(Uruguay) Marcelo Saracchi	(Argentina) Boca Juniors	Houston Dynamo FC	Transfer
August 12, 2026	(Sweden) Gustav Berggren	New York Red Bulls	(Poland) Lech Poznań	Transfer
August 12, 2026	(Serbia) Aleksa Cvetković	(Serbia) OFK Beograd	Vancouver Whitecaps FC	Transfer
August 12, 2026	(Australia) Lucas Herrington	Colorado Rapids	(England) Hull City	Transfer
August 13, 2026	(United States) Aziel Jackson	(Poland) Jagiellonia Białystok	Minnesota United FC	Loan
August 13, 2026	(Venezuela) Josef Martínez	(Mexico) Tijuana	Columbus Crew	Free
August 13, 2026	(United States) Tahir Reid-Brown	Orlando City SC	St. Louis City SC	Trade
August 13, 2026	(Germany) Armindo Sieb	(Germany) Bayern Munich	Los Angeles FC	Transfer
August 13, 2026	(South Africa) Tylon Smith	(England) Queens Park Rangers	New England Revolution	Loan
August 14, 2026	(United States) Wilson Eisner	San Diego FC	(United States) FC Tulsa	Loan
August 14, 2026	(Panama) Mijahir Jiménez	(Panama) Plaza Amador	New York Red Bulls	Transfer
August 14, 2026	(United States) Eric Klein	New England Revolution	(United States) Rhode Island FC	Loan
August 14, 2026	(Argentina) Ezequiel Ponce	Houston Dynamo FC	(Spain) Elche	Transfer
August 15, 2026	(Haiti) Lovend's Delinois	(United States) Inter Miami CF II	Inter Miami CF	Free
August 16, 2026	(Japan) Miki Yamane	LA Galaxy	(Japan) Urawa Red Diamonds	Transfer
August 17, 2026	(Haiti) Woobens Pacius	Nashville SC	(France) Rouen	Transfer
August 17, 2026	(France) Hugo Picard	Columbus Crew	(France) Troyes	Loan
August 18, 2026	(United States) Zavier Gozo	Real Salt Lake	(England) Crystal Palace	Transfer
August 18, 2026	(United States) Bryce Jamison	Colorado Rapids	(United States) Colorado Springs Switchbacks FC	Loan
August 18, 2026	(Brazil) André Luiz	(Greece) Olympiacos	Sporting Kansas City	Transfer
August 20, 2026	(Colombia) Sebastian Ramírez	(Colombia) Fortaleza	Vancouver Whitecaps FC	Loan
August 21, 2026	(United States) Jacob Murrell	D.C. United	(Scotland) Falkirk	Transfer
August 21, 2026	(United States) Colin Guske	Orlando City SC	Real Salt Lake	Loan
August 21, 2026	(United States) Adyn Torres	Atlanta United FC	(Estonia) Nõmme United	Loan
August 22, 2026	(Tunisia) Anisse Saidi	San Diego FC	(Portugal) Benfica	Loan
August 23, 2026	(Switzerland) Breel Embolo	(France) Rennes	Atlanta United FC	Transfer
August 24, 2026	(United States) Christopher Cupps	Chicago Fire FC	(Scotland) Greenock Morton	Loan
August 24, 2026	(Germany) Maurice Malone	(Austria) Sturm Graz	Minnesota United FC	Transfer
August 25, 2026	(Ecuador) Sergio Vásquez	(Ecuador) Orense	Los Angeles FC	Transfer
August 25, 2026	(Serbia) Dejan Joveljić	Sporting Kansas City	Seattle Sounders FC	Trade
August 26, 2026	(United States) CJ Fodrey	Austin FC	(Scotland) Falkirk	Loan
August 26, 2026	(Canada) Emrick Fotsing	(Canada) Vancouver FC	Vancouver Whitecaps FC	Transfer
August 26, 2026	(Germany) Eduard Löwen	St. Louis City SC	San Jose Earthquakes	Trade
August 26, 2026	(Canada) Jayden Nelson	Austin FC	(England) Bolton Wanderers	Transfer
August 26, 2026	(United States) Owen Wolff	Austin FC	Sporting Kansas City	Trade
August 27, 2026	(Austria) Dominik Fitz	Minnesota United FC	(Austria) Wolfsberger	Loan
August 27, 2026	(Haiti) Louicius Deedson	FC Dallas	(France) Sochaux	Transfer
August 27, 2026	(United States) Stas Korzeniowski	Philadelphia Union	(United States) Rhode Island FC	Loan
August 27, 2026	(Brazil) Vinícius Nogueira	(Bulgaria) Ludogorets Razgrad	Orlando City SC	Loan
August 27, 2026	(Haiti) Nelson Pierre	Vancouver Whitecaps FC	(Canada) HFX Wanderers	Loan
August 27, 2026	(Norway) Stian Rode Gregersen	Atlanta United FC	(Sweden) Malmö FF	Transfer
August 27, 2026	(United States) Judah Siqueira	(United States) New England Revolution II	New England Revolution	Homegrown player
August 28, 2026	(Czech Republic) Ondřej Lingr	Houston Dynamo FC	(Poland) Korona Kielce	Transfer
August 28, 2026	(Trinidad and Tobago) Dante Sealy	Colorado Rapids	CF Montréal	Trade
August 29, 2026	(United States) Tommy Mihalić	(United States) Los Angeles FC 2	Los Angeles FC	Free
August 31, 2026	(United States) Owen Presthus	Columbus Crew	Nashville SC	Loan
August 31, 2026	(Finland) Leo Walta	(Wales) Swansea City	Los Angeles FC	Loan
September 1, 2026	(Israel) Sayed Abu Farchi	(Israel) Maccabi Tel Aviv	Colorado Rapids	Transfer
September 1, 2026	(United States) Luca Bombino	San Diego FC	(England) Stoke City	Transfer
September 1, 2026	(Guyana) Osaze De Rosario	Seattle Sounders FC	(Denmark) Sønderjyske	Loan
September 1, 2026	(Guinea) Yadaly Diaby	(France) Grenoble	Vancouver Whitecaps FC	Transfer
September 1, 2026	(Hungary) Dániel Gazdag	Columbus Crew	New England Revolution	Free
September 1, 2026	(Norway) Dennis Gjengaar	New York Red Bulls	(Norway) Vålerenga	Transfer
September 1, 2026	(Norway) Andreas Hanche-Olsen	(Germany) Mainz 05	Chicago Fire FC	Transfer
September 1, 2026	(Venezuela) David Martínez	Los Angeles FC	(Denmark) Midtjylland	Transfer
September 1, 2026	(United States) Jack McGlynn	Houston Dynamo FC	(England) Stoke City	Transfer
September 1, 2026	(Georgia (country)) Anzor Mekvabishvili	(Romania) Universitatea Craiova	Chicago Fire FC	Transfer
September 1, 2026	(Angola) Rui Modesto	(Italy) Udinese	Vancouver Whitecaps FC	Transfer
September 1, 2026	(Denmark) Erik Sviatchenko	Houston Dynamo FC	(Thailand) Port	Free
September 2, 2026	(United States) Markus Anderson	Philadelphia Union	(Denmark) Lyngby BK	Loan
September 2, 2026	(United States) Chris Applewhite	Nashville SC	Austin FC	Loan
September 2, 2026	(United States) Taylor Booth	(Netherlands) Twente	Real Salt Lake	Loan
September 2, 2026	(Canada) Charles-Emile Brunet	Nashville SC	St. Louis City SC	Loan
September 2, 2026	(United States) Caden Clark	D.C. United	Seattle Sounders FC	Trade
September 2, 2026	(Canada) Luc de Fougerolles	(England) Fulham	Real Salt Lake	Loan
September 2, 2026	(Czech Republic) David Douděra	(Czech Republic) Slavia Prague	FC Cincinnati	Transfer
September 2, 2026	(United States) Damion Downs	(England) Southampton	St. Louis City SC	Loan
September 2, 2026	(Brazil) Riquelme Fillipi	(Brazil) Palmeiras	Inter Miami CF	Transfer
September 2, 2026	(Paraguay) Matías Galarza	(Argentina) River Plate	Inter Miami CF	Loan
September 2, 2026	(Argentina) Giuliano Galoppo	(Argentina) River Plate	Atlanta United FC	Loan
September 2, 2026	(United States) Johan Gómez	(Germany) Eintracht Braunschweig	Chicago Fire FC	Transfer
September 2, 2026	(Venezuela) Ronald Hernández	Atlanta United FC	Portland Timbers	Trade
September 2, 2026	(Nigeria) Daniel Job	(Norway) Kongsvinger	FC Dallas	Transfer
September 2, 2026	(Canada) Liam Mackenzie	Vancouver Whitecaps FC	(Canada) HFX Wanderers	Loan
September 2, 2026	(Cameroon) David Mimbang	(Denmark) Nordsjælland	San Diego FC	Loan
September 2, 2026	(Trinidad and Tobago) Roald Mitchell	New York Red Bulls	(Denmark) Viborg	Loan
September 2, 2026	(Scotland) Lewis Morgan	San Diego FC	Toronto FC	Trade
September 2, 2026	(Brazil) Rafael Navarro	Colorado Rapids	St. Louis City SC	Trade
September 2, 2026	(United States) Devin Padelford	Minnesota United FC	New York Red Bulls	Loan
September 2, 2026	(Colombia) Alejandro Piedrahita	(Bulgaria) CSKA Sofia	Toronto FC	Loan
September 2, 2026	(Serbia) Viktor Radojević	Chicago Fire FC	CF Montréal	Loan
September 2, 2026	(Uruguay) Santiago Rodríguez	(Brazil) Botafogo	Columbus Crew	Transfer
September 2, 2026	(Honduras) David Ruiz	Inter Miami CF	New York Red Bulls	Loan
September 2, 2026	(Ghana) Ibrahim Sadiq	(Netherlands) AZ	Colorado Rapids	Transfer
September 2, 2026	(United States) Jason Shokalook	Chicago Fire FC	Real Salt Lake	Loan
September 2, 2026	(Netherlands) Cherrion Valerius	(Netherlands) NAC Breda	Minnesota United FC	Loan
September 2, 2026	(United States) Sam Vines	Houston Dynamo FC	San Diego FC	Loan
September 2, 2026	(England) Morgan Whittaker	(England) Middlesbrough	Colorado Rapids	Transfer
September 2, 2026	(Morocco) Anass Zaroury	(Greece) Panathinaikos	Columbus Crew	Loan
September 3, 2026	(Greece) Noah Allen	Inter Miami CF	Chicago Fire FC	Loan
September 3, 2026	(Democratic Republic of the Congo) Cédric Bakambu	(Spain) Real Betis	San Diego FC	Free
September 3, 2026	(United States) Dylan Borso	Chicago Fire FC	(Scotland) Greenock Morton	Loan
September 3, 2026	(Brazil) Lucas Calegari	(Turkey) Eyüpspor	LA Galaxy	Transfer
September 3, 2026	(South Africa) Lyle Foster	(England) Burnley	Houston Dynamo FC	Loan
September 3, 2026	(Venezuela) Kevin Kelsy	Portland Timbers	(Scotland) Rangers	Transfer
September 3, 2026	(Argentina) Julián Malatini	(Germany) Werder Bremen	FC Cincinnati	Loan
September 3, 2026	(United States) Ruben Ramos Jr	LA Galaxy	Sporting Kansas City	Loan
September 3, 2026	(Jamaica) Seymour Reid	New York City FC	Sporting Kansas City	Loan
September 3, 2026	(Brazil) Thayllon Roberth	(Brazil) Avaí	Los Angeles FC	Loan
September 3, 2026	(Argentina) Pablo Ruiz	Real Salt Lake	LA Galaxy	Trade
September 3, 2026	(Canada) Joel Waterman	Chicago Fire FC	Portland Timbers	Trade
September 3, 2026	(United States) Joshua Wynder	(Portugal) Benfica	New England Revolution	Loan
September 3, 2026	(Serbia) Dušan Žagar	(Serbia) IMT	Real Salt Lake	Transfer
September 4, 2026	(Cameroon) Ascel Essengue	LA Galaxy	(United States) Phoenix Rising	Loan
September 4, 2026	(Canada) Deandre Kerr	Toronto FC	(Portugal) AVS	Transfer
September 4, 2026	(Nigeria) Victor Olatunji	Real Salt Lake	(Belgium) SK Beveren	Loan
September 4, 2026	(United States) Ryan Schewe	Sporting Kansas City	(United States) Louisville City	Loan
September 9, 2026	(United States) Bryan Dowd	(United States) Colorado Rapids 2	Colorado Rapids	Free
September 10, 2026	(Canada) Sydney Wathuta	Colorado Rapids	(United States) Orange County SC	Loan
September 15, 2026	(United States) Bryce Duke	San Diego FC	(New Zealand) Wellington Phoenix	Transfer
September 15, 2026	(Canada) Emrick Fotsing	Vancouver Whitecaps FC	(Canada) Vancouver FC	Loan
September 15, 2026	(United States) Stiven Jimenez	FC Cincinnati	(Brazil) Fluminense	Loan
September 17, 2026	(United States) Connor Dale	(United States) FC Cincinnati Academy	FC Cincinnati	Homegrown player
September 17, 2026	(Canada) Owen Graham-Roache	CF Montréal	(Canada) Cavalry FC	Loan
September 18, 2026	(Netherlands) Tyrell Malacia	(England) Manchester United	FC Cincinnati	Free
September 18, 2026	(United States) Dennis Nelich	(United States) New York Red Bulls II	New York Red Bulls	Free
September 22, 2026	(United States) Matt Miazga	FC Cincinnati	New York City FC	Waivers
September 24, 2026	(United States) Zack Campagnolo	(United States) Colorado Rapids 2	St. Louis City SC	Loan
September 25, 2026	(United States) Eric Izoita	(United States) Portland Timbers 2	Portland Timbers	Homegrown player
September 26, 2026	(Canada) Johnny Selemani	(Canada) Whitecaps FC 2	Vancouver Whitecaps FC	Homegrown player
October 9, 2026	(Canada) Antone Bossenberry	(Canada) Toronto FC II	Toronto FC	Homegrown player
October 9, 2026	(Mali) Abdoulaye Doucouré	(Saudi Arabia) Neom SC	Charlotte FC	Free
October 9, 2026	(Mali) Sekou Koné	(United States) New York Red Bulls II	New York Red Bulls	Free
October 9, 2026	(Venezuela) José Martínez	(Brazil) Corinthians	FC Cincinnati	Free
October 9, 2026	(Canada) Hugo Mbongue	(United States) Crown Legacy FC	Charlotte FC	Free
October 9, 2026	(United States) Nathan Richmond	(United States) Crown Legacy FC	Charlotte FC	Free
2026	(Mexico) Brian Gutiérrez	(Mexico) Guadalajara	New York Red Bulls	Free
2026	(Malaysia) Wan Kuzain	(United States) Sporting JAX	New York Red Bulls	Free
