= 2026 San Diego FC season =

San Diego FC 2026 soccer season

San Diego FC
2026 season
- General manager: Tyler Heaps
- Head coach: Mikey Varas
- Stadium: Snapdragon Stadium
- Major League Soccer: Conference: 13th Overall: 25th
- MLS Cup playoffs: Did not qualify
- CONCACAF Champions Cup: Round of 16
- Leagues Cup: League phase
- Top goalscorer: League: Anders Dreyer (15); All: Anders Dreyer (16)
Home colors	Away colors

The 2026 season was the second season for San Diego FC in Major League Soccer (MLS), the top flight of professional soccer clubs in the United States. The team played their home matches at Snapdragon Stadium, which it shared with San Diego Wave FC of the National Women's Soccer League (NWSL) and the San Diego State Aztecs team.

The team was managed by former FC Dallas and United States men's national team assistant Mikey Varas in his second season as head coach.

== Competitions ==
=== Major League Soccer ===
==== Standings ====
MLS Western Conference table (2026)
Pos	Team	Pld	W	L	T	GF	GA	GD	Pts
11	LA Galaxy	34	11	12	11	50	57	−7	44
12	Colorado Rapids	34	12	15	7	47	50	−3	43
13	San Diego FC	34	9	14	11	57	63	−6	38
14	Austin FC	34	8	16	10	42	65	−23	34
15	Sporting Kansas City	34	7	22	5	40	81	−41	26

Source: MLS
Rules for classification: 1) points; 2) total wins; 3) total goal differential; 4) total goals scored; 5) fewer disciplinary points; 6) away goal differential; 7) away goals scored; 8) home goals differential; 9) home goals scored; 10) coin toss (2 clubs tied) or drawing of lots (≥3 clubs tied)

==== Results summary ====
Overall								Home						Away					
Pld	W	D	L	GF	GA	GD	Pts	W	D	L	GF	GA	GD	W	D	L	GF	GA	GD
34	9	11	14	57	63	−6	38	6	5	6	37	30	+7	3	6	8	20	33	−13

Last updated: Complete.
Source: MLS

Results by matchday
Matchday	1	2	3	4	5	6	7	8	9	10	11	12	13	14	15	16	17	18	19	20	21	22	23	24	25	26	27	28	29	30	31	32	33	34
Stadium	H	H	A	A	H	A	H	A	A	H	H	A	H	H	H	A	H	A	A	A	H	H	A	H	H	A	A	A	H	A	H	A	A	H
Result	W	W	W	D	D	L	L	L	L	L	D	D	W	D	L	L	W	D	W	L	W	W	L	L	L	D	D	L	D	D	D	L	W	L
Points	3	6	9	10	11	11	11	11	11	11	12	13	16	17	17	17	20	21	24	24	27	30	30	30	30	31	32	32	33	34	35	35	38	38
Position	1	1	1	3	4	7	8	9	10	11	12	13	10	10	10	13	12	13	12	13	11	8	9	9	9	10	12	12	12	12	12	13	13	13

Source: MLS
A = Away; H = Home; W = Win; D = Draw; L = Loss

==== Regular season ====
The MLS regular season schedule was released on November 20, 2025. Every team will play 34 matches, of which 17 are at home; this includes a full home-and-away series against the fourteen other teams in the Western Conference and six matches against opponents from the Eastern Conference.

February 21 1	San Diego FC	5–0	CF Montréal	San Diego, California
7:30 p.m. PST	McVey 14', (yellow card) 62'; Pellegrino 45+2'; Valakari 53'; Ingvartsen 59'; Zamblé 85'	Report	Loturi (yellow card) 5'; Avilés (red card) 50'	Stadium: Snapdragon Stadium; Attendance: 25,412; Referee: Joe Dickerson

March 1 2	San Diego FC	2–0	St. Louis City SC	San Diego, California
6:00 p.m. PST	Dreyer 3'; Ingvartsen 54'	Report	Durkin (yellow card) 45+1'	Stadium: Snapdragon Stadium; Attendance: 21,969; Referee: Drew Fischer

March 7 3	Sporting Kansas City	0–1	San Diego FC	Kansas City, Kansas
5:30 p.m. PST	Miller (yellow card) 36'; García (yellow card) 38'; Davis (yellow card) 81'	Report	Bombino (yellow card) 27'; Dreyer 39'; Duah (yellow card) 75'; McVey (yellow card) 78'; Vazquez (yellow card) 80'	Stadium: Sporting Park; Attendance: 14,294; Referee: Malik Badawi

March 14 4	FC Dallas	3–3	San Diego FC	Frisco, Texas
5:30 p.m. PDT	Cappis (yellow card) 23'; Johansson (yellow card) 30'; Musa 41', 54', 90+5'; Farrington (yellow card) 90+10'	Report	Valakari 21' (pen.), 51'; Ingvartsen 31' (pen.); Soma (yellow card) 40'; Bombino (yellow card) 86'	Stadium: Toyota Stadium; Attendance: 11,004; Referee: Ricardo Montero

March 22 5	San Diego FC	2–2	Real Salt Lake	San Diego, California
4:00 p.m. PDT	Ingvartsen 27'; Dreyer 56'; McVey (yellow card) 85' (yellow-red card) 89'; Godoy (yellow card) 87'	Report	Solans 17'; Caliskan (yellow card) 40'; Dillon (yellow card) 49'; Olatunji 85'	Stadium: Snapdragon Stadium; Attendance: 24,141; Referee: Alexis Da Silva

April 4 6	San Jose Earthquakes	3–0	San Diego FC	San Jose, California
7:30 p.m. PDT	Bouda (yellow card) 11'; Tsakiris 13', 34' (pen.), (yellow card) 90+3'; Judd 45+3'; González (yellow card) 77'	Report	Duah (red card) 32'; Søe (yellow card) 52'; Tverskov (yellow card) 59'	Stadium: PayPal Park; Attendance: 17,410; Referee: Fotis Bazakos

April 11 7	San Diego FC	1–2	Minnesota United FC	San Diego, California
7:30 p.m. PDT	Bombino 7'; McVey (yellow card) 12' (yellow-red card) 46'; Verhoeven (yellow card) 30'	Report	Duncan 15'; Yeboah 40'; Pereyra (yellow card) 69'	Stadium: Snapdragon Stadium; Attendance: 23,394; Referee: Victor Rivas

April 18 8	Real Salt Lake	4–2	San Diego FC	Sandy, Utah
6:30 p.m. PDT	Luna 5'; Solans 6', 37'; Guilavogui 45' (yellow card) 51'	Report	Ingvartsen 14'; Duke (yellow card) 45+5'; Dreyer 66'	Stadium: America First Field; Attendance: 20,852; Referee: Ismail Elfath

April 22 9	Houston Dynamo FC	1–0	San Diego FC	Houston, Texas
5:30 p.m. PDT	Andrade (yellow card) 14'; Aliyu 35'; Negri (yellow card) 90+3'; Lingr (red card) 90+7'	Report	Godoy (yellow card) 38'; Pellegrino (red card) 79'; Pilcher (yellow card) 90+7'	Stadium: Shell Energy Stadium; Attendance: 15,838; Referee: Rubiel Vazquez

April 25 10	San Diego FC	1−2	Portland Timbers	San Diego, California
6:30 p.m. PDT	Dreyer 33' (pen.); Ingvartsen (yellow card) 63'; Soma (yellow card) 76'	Report	Kelsy 26'; Velde (yellow card) 69'; Bonetig 90+6'	Stadium: Snapdragon Stadium; Attendance: 22,396; Referee: Jon Freemon

May 2 11	San Diego FC	2–2	Los Angeles FC	San Diego, California
6:30 p.m. PDT	Ingvartsen 7', 71'; Vazquez (yellow card) 15'; Pilcher (yellow card) 73'; Godoy (yellow card) 78'	Report	Nielsen (yellow card) 59'; Bouanga 82'; Hollingshead 90+14'	Stadium: Snapdragon Stadium; Attendance: 28,459; Referee: Filip Dujic

May 9 12	Seattle Sounders FC	1–1	San Diego FC	Seattle, Washington
7:30 p.m. PDT	Ferreira (yellow card) 51'; Brunell (yellow card) 56'; C. Roldan (yellow card) 57'; Musovski 80'	Report	Ingvartsen 18'; Mighten (yellow card) 75'; Verhoeven (yellow card) 78'	Stadium: Lumen Field; Attendance: 31,528; Referee: Armando Villarreal

May 13 13	San Diego FC	5–0	Austin FC	San Diego, California
6:30 p.m. PDT	Vazquez 8', 90+1'; Dreyer 17'; Bombino (yellow card) 44'; Soma 54'; Ingvartsen 79'	Report		Stadium: Snapdragon Stadium; Attendance: 19,194; Referee: Malik Badawi

May 16 14	San Diego FC	3–3	FC Cincinnati	San Diego, California
6:30 p.m. PDT	Ingvartsen 32', 90+6'; Vazquez (yellow card) 54'; Pellegrino 66'	Report	Mboma Dem 11'; Robinson (yellow card) 24'; Barlow 50', 90+8', (yellow card) 90'; Nwobodo (yellow card) 87'	Stadium: Snapdragon Stadium; Attendance: 24,984; Referee: Timothy Ford

May 23 15	San Diego FC	2–4	Vancouver Whitecaps FC	San Diego, California
6:30 p.m. PDT	Vazquez 53'; Zamblé 90+1'; Bombino (yellow card) 55' (yellow-red card) 72'; Verhoeven (yellow card) 88'	Report	White 30', 45', 51'; Caicedo 67', (yellow card) 90+2'; Priso 75'; Badwal (yellow card) 63'	Stadium: Snapdragon Stadium; Attendance: 23,906; Referee: Drew Fischer

July 22 16	Colorado Rapids	1–0	San Diego FC	Commerce City, Colorado
6:30 p.m. PDT	Williams (yellow card) 22', (goal) 90+6'; Cannon (yellow card) 28'; Navarro (yellow card) 82'; Yapi (yellow card) 84'	Report	McVey (yellow card) 19'; Murphy (yellow card) 71'; Morgan (yellow card) 90+5'	Stadium: Dick's Sporting Goods Park; Attendance: 15,109; Referee: Chris Penso

July 25 17	San Diego FC	1–0	FC Dallas	San Diego, California
6:30 p.m. PDT	Alvarado 50'	Report	Kamungo (yellow card) 81'; Julio (yellow card) 88'	Stadium: Snapdragon Stadium; Attendance: 24,489; Referee: Victor Rivas

August 1 18	Minnesota United FC	1–1	San Diego FC	Saint Paul, Minnesota
5:30 p.m. PDT	Chancalay 3'; Callender (yellow card) 64'	Report	Dreyer 64' (pen.), (yellow card) 64'	Stadium: Allianz Field; Attendance: 19,607; Referee: Timothy Ford

August 15 19	Los Angeles FC	0–1	San Diego FC	Los Angeles, California
7:30 p.m. PDT	Segura (yellow card) 62'; Delgado (yellow card) 80'; Choinière (yellow card) 84'; Son Heung-Min (yellow card) 90+7'	Report	Alvarado (yellow card) 30'; Valakari (yellow card) 75'; Dreyer 89' (pen.), (yellow card) 90' (yellow-red card) 90+7'	Stadium: BMO Stadium; Attendance: 22,810; Referee: Ismail Elfath

August 19 20	Portland Timbers	3–1	San Diego FC	Portland, Oregon
7:30 p.m. PDT	Lassiter (yellow card) 17', (goal) 51'; Velde 29'; Da Costa 68'; Kelsy (yellow card) 90+6'	Report	Pirani 45+1'; Verhoeven (yellow card) 90+1'	Stadium: Providence Park; Attendance: 20,617; Referee: Rubiel Vazquez

August 22 21	San Diego FC	3–0	Colorado Rapids	San Diego, California
7:30 p.m. PDT	Valakari 27'; Achouri 35'; Pirani 71'	Report	Cannon (yellow card) 58'; Rosenberry (yellow card) 89'; Harris (yellow card) 90+2'	Stadium: Snapdragon Stadium; Attendance: 21,697; Referee: Pierre-Luc Lauziere

August 29 22	San Diego FC	3–1	LA Galaxy	San Diego, California
7:30 p.m. PDT	Achouri 11'; Tverskov (yellow card) 23' (red card) 50'; Pirani (yellow card) 30'; Godoy (yellow card) 39'; Sargeant 48'; Pellegrino 70'; dos Santos (yellow card) 89'	Report	Reus (yellow card) 21'; Lozano 55'; Paintsil (yellow card) 65'	Stadium: Snapdragon Stadium; Attendance: 27,971; Referee: Tori Penso

September 5 23	Orlando City SC	1–0	San Diego FC	Orlando, Florida
4:30 p.m. PDT	Griezmann 28'; Otávio (yellow card) 85'; Brekalo (yellow card) 90+8'; Angulo (yellow card) 90+9'	Report	Vazquez (yellow card) 84'; Sargeant (yellow card) 90+4'	Stadium: Inter.co Stadium; Attendance: 19,007; Referee: Joseph Dickerson

September 9 24	San Diego FC	2–3	San Jose Earthquakes	San Diego, California
7:30 p.m. PDT	dos Santos (yellow card) 7' (red card) 80'; McVey (yellow card) 18'; Dreyer 42'; Tverskov (yellow card) 52'; Bakambu 90+4' (pen.)	Report	Tsakiris 3', (penalty missed) 8'; Judd 12', (yellow card) 13'; Bouda 35', (yellow card) 37'; Leroux (yellow card) 45+3'; Floriani (yellow card) 75' (red card) 90+2'; Vieira (yellow card) 90+5'	Stadium: Snapdragon Stadium; Attendance: 18,799; Referee: Alexis Da Silva

September 13 25	San Diego FC	0–5	Philadelphia Union	San Diego, California
6:00 p.m. PDT	Alvarado Jr. (yellow card) 45+2'; Verhoeven (yellow card) 90+1'	Report	Damiani (yellow card) 27', (goal) 67'; C. Sullivan 45+5', 61'; Pierre (yellow card) 45+7'; Godoy 87' (o.g.); Jakupovic 90+4'	Stadium: Snapdragon Stadium; Attendance: 21,171; Referee: Ismail Elfath

September 20 26	Inter Miami CF	2–2	San Diego FC	Miami, Florida
4:00 p.m. PDT	Messi 24'; Bright (yellow card) 64'; Suárez 74'; Shaw (yellow card) 81'	Report	Dreyer 12', 82'; Murphy (yellow card) 33'	Stadium: Nu Stadium; Attendance: 25,743; Referee: Rosendo Mendoza

September 26 27	Austin FC	3–3	San Diego FC	Austin, Texas
5:30 p.m. PDT	Vázquez 73'; Ramirez 82', 86', (yellow card) 87'	Report	Godoy 50'; Desler 57' (o.g.); Ingvartsen 64'	Stadium: Q2 Stadium; Attendance: 20,738; Referee: Jon Freemon

October 10 28	New York Red Bulls	4–1	San Diego FC	Harrison, New Jersey
4:30 p.m. PDT	Hall 16'; Padelford 20', (yellow card) 83'; Ruvalcaba 27'; Bazán (yellow card) 43'; Choupo-Moting 90+3'	Report	Tverskov (yellow card) 31'; Dreyer (penalty missed) 44'; Duah (yellow card) 55'; Bakambu 60'; Sargeant (yellow card) 86'	Stadium: Sports Illustrated Stadium; Attendance: 18,937; Referee: Malik Badawi

October 14 29	San Diego FC	3–3	Houston Dynamo FC	San Diego, California
7:30 p.m. PDT	Dreyer 20' (pen.), (yellow card) 77'; Bakambu 22'; Sargeant (yellow card) 53'; Godoy (yellow card) 79'; Pirani 86'	Report	Ennali (yellow card) 5'; Bond (yellow card) 19'; Guilherme 24', 37', (yellow card) 44'; Bogusz 33'	Stadium: Snapdragon Stadium; Attendance: 18,650; Referee: Sergii Boiko

October 17 30	LA Galaxy	2–2	San Diego FC	Carson, California
7:30 p.m. PDT	Klauss 4', (yellow card) 45+1'; Thommy 17'; Reus (yellow card) 90+3'	Report	Dreyer 10' (pen.); Godoy (yellow card) 35'; Pirani 39'	Stadium: Dignity Health Sports Park; Attendance: 21,264; Referee: Rubiel Vazquez

October 24 31	San Diego FC	2–2	Seattle Sounders FC	San Diego, California
7:30 p.m. PDT	Dreyer 60'; Bakambu 90+6' (pen.)	Report	Joveljić 50', (yellow card) 53'; Gomez 55'; Roldan (yellow card) 59'	Stadium: Snapdragon Stadium; Attendance: 21,954; Referee: Allen Chapman

October 28 32	Vancouver Whitecaps FC	4–1	San Diego FC	Vancouver, British Columbia
7:30 p.m. PDT	Cvetković 24'; White 41'; Gauld 66'; Caicedo 76'; Johnson (yellow card) 82'; Elloumi (yellow card) 90+1' (yellow-red card) 90+4'	Report	Duah (yellow card) 2'; Tverskov (yellow card) 55'; Valakari 83'	Stadium: BC Place; Attendance: 21,718; Referee: Joe Dickerson

October 31 33	St. Louis City SC	0–1	San Diego FC	St. Louis, Missouri
12:00 p.m. PDT	MacNaughton (yellow card) 74'; Holse (yellow card) 87'	Report	Dreyer 39'; Alvarado Jr. (yellow card) 56'	Stadium: Energizer Park; Attendance: 22,423; Referee: Jon Freemon

November 7 34	San Diego FC	0–1	Sporting Kansas City	San Diego, California
4:00 p.m. PST	Ingvartsen (yellow card) 57'; Duah (yellow card) 67'; McVey (yellow card) 73'	Report	Johnsen (yellow card) 61'; Reynolds (yellow card) 70'; André Luiz 76' (pen.)	Stadium: Snapdragon Stadium; Attendance: 23,695; Referee: Ramy Touchan

=== CONCACAF Champions Cup ===
==== Round One ====
February 3 1st Leg	San Diego FC (United States)	4–1	(Mexico) UNAM	San Diego, California
8:00 p.m. PST	Godoy (yellow card) 67'; Duah 68'; Vazquez 76'; Mighten 81'; Bombino 86'; Sisniega (yellow card) 89'	Report	Morales 11'; Medina (yellow card) 67'	Stadium: Snapdragon Stadium; Attendance: 19,133; Referee: Mario Escobar (Guatemala)

February 10 2nd Leg	UNAM (Mexico)	1–0 (2–4 agg.)	(United States) San Diego FC	Mexico City, Mexico
5:00 p.m. PST	Duarte (yellow card) 8' (yellow-red card) 90+6'; Vite 47'	Report	Godoy (yellow card) 25'; McVey (yellow card) 75'	Stadium: Estadio Olímpico Universitario; Attendance: 11,934; Referee: Hector Martínez (Honduras)
Note: San Diego FC won 4–2 on aggregate.

==== Round of 16 ====
March 11 1st Leg	San Diego FC (United States)	3–2	(Mexico) Toluca	San Diego, California
8:30 p.m. PDT	Ingvartsen (red card) 12'; Vazquez 32', 46'; Dreyer 53'; Bombino (yellow card) 59'; Duah (yellow card) 66' (red card) 88'	Report	Ruiz (yellow card) 7'; Gallardo 16' (pen.); López (yellow card) 45'; Díaz (yellow card) 45+4'; Pereira (yellow card) 69'; Helinho 90' (pen.)	Stadium: Snapdragon Stadium; Attendance: 20,652; Referee: Walter López (Guatemala)

March 18 2nd Leg	Toluca (Mexico)	4–0 (6–3 agg.)	(United States) San Diego FC	Toluca, Mexico
8:00 p.m. PDT	Paulinho (yellow card) 12', (goal) 56'; Díaz (yellow card) 40'; Angulo 43', 59', (yellow card) 87'; Gallardo 90+2'	Report	McVey (yellow card) 40' (yellow-red card) 85'; Tverskov (yellow card) 44'	Stadium: Estadio Nemesio Díez; Attendance: 23,322; Referee: Ismael Cornejo (El Salvador)
Note: Toluca won 6–3 on aggregate.

=== Leagues Cup ===
August 6 Round One	América (Mexico)	3–1	(United States) San Diego FC	Mexico City
7:00 p.m. PDT	Rodríguez 11'; Sánchez 33'; Violante 45+2'	Report	McVey (yellow card) 30'; Bombino 63'; Tverskov (yellow card) 85'	Stadium: Estadio Banorte; Attendance: 39,993; Referee: Mario Escobar

August 9 Round One	San Diego FC (United States)	1–0	(Mexico) Tijuana	San Diego, California
7:00 p.m. PDT	Zamblé 22'; Godoy (yellow card) 45+1'; Duah (yellow card) 73'	Report	Porozo (yellow card) 45+5'; González (yellow card) 78'; Gómez (yellow card) 88'	Stadium: Snapdragon Stadium; Attendance: 31,538; Referee: Steven Madrigal

August 12 Round One	San Diego FC (United States)	3–2	(Mexico) Puebla	San Diego, California
7:15 p.m. PDT	Søe 4'; Vázquez 76'; Þórhallsson 80'	Report	Velasco 30'; Mustre 86'	Stadium: Snapdragon Stadium; Attendance: 18,212; Referee: Daniel Quintero

== Players ==
=== Roster ===
As of September 15, 2026

Note: Flags indicate national team as defined under FIFA eligibility rules; some limited exceptions apply. Players may hold more than one non-FIFA nationality.

No.	Pos.	Nation	Player
1	GK	CPV	CJ dos Santos
2	DF	GHA	Willy Kumado
3	DF	ISL	Dagur Dan Þórhallsson
5	DF	USA	Kieran Sargeant
6	MF	DEN	Jeppe Tverskov
7	FW	DEN	Marcus Ingvartsen
8	MF	FIN	Onni Valakari
10	FW	DEN	Anders Dreyer
12	MF	BRA	Gabriel Pirani
13	GK	MEX	Pablo Sisniega
14	FW	CIV	Bryan Zamblé
15	MF	USA	Pedro Soma
16	GK	DEN	Marcus Alstrup
17	DF	DEN	Osvald Søe
18	GK	USA	Duran Ferree

No.	Pos.	Nation	Player
19	MF	USA	David Vazquez
20	MF	PAN	Aníbal Godoy
23	DF	USA	Sam Vines (on loan from Houston Dynamo)
24	MF	GHA	Emmanuel Boateng
25	DF	USA	Ian Pilcher
26	DF	GHA	Manu Duah
32	DF	USA	Ian Murphy
33	DF	USA	Oscar Verhoeven
70	MF	USA	Alejandro Alvarado Jr.
77	FW	ENG	Alex Mighten
90	FW	NOR	Amahl Pellegrino
94	FW	COD	Cédric Bakambu
97	DF	SWE	Christopher McVey
99	FW	TUN	Elias Achouri
—	MF	CMR	David Mimbang (on loan from Nordsjælland)

=== Out on loan ===
Note: Flags indicate national team as defined under FIFA eligibility rules; some limited exceptions apply. Players may hold more than one non-FIFA nationality.

No.	Pos.	Nation	Player
11	FW	MEX	Hirving Lozano (on loan to LA Galaxy)
22	DF	USA	Wilson Eisner (on loan to FC Tulsa)

No.	Pos.	Nation	Player
29	FW	TUN	Anisse Saidi (on loan to Benfica)
98	GK	USA	Jacob Jackson (on loan to Monterey Bay FC)

== Coaching staff ==
As of December 2024

Technical staff
Position	Name	Nationality
Head coach	Mikey Varas	United States
Assistant coach	Frank Hjortebjerg	Denmark
Assistant coach	Kelvin Jones	United States
Assistant coach	Luciano Fusco	United States
Goalkeeper coach	Jason Grubb	United States

== Transfers ==
For transfers in, dates listed are when San Diego FC officially signed the player to the roster. Transactions where only the rights to the players are acquired are not listed. For transfers out, dates listed are when San Diego FC officially removed the players from its roster, not when they signed with another club. If a player later signed with another club, his new club will be noted, but the date listed here remains the one when he was officially removed from the San Diego FC roster.

=== In ===
Incoming transfers for San Diego FC
Player	No.	Pos.	Previous team	Notes	Date
(United States) Luca Bombino	27	DF	(United States) Los Angeles FC	Trade	November 18, 2025
(United States) Oscar Verhoeven	33	DF	(United States) San Jose Earthquakes	Trade	November 19, 2025
(United States) David Vazquez	19	MF	(United States) Philadelphia Union	Trade	December 9, 2025
(Finland) Onni Valakari	8	MF	(Cyprus) Pafos FC	Transfer	December 9, 2025
(Scotland) Lewis Morgan	9	FW	(United States) New York Red Bulls	Trade	December 16, 2025
(United States) Kieran Sargeant	5	DF	(United States) Houston Dynamo FC	Trade	December 18, 2025
(United States) Wilson Eisner	22	DF	(United States) San Jose Earthquakes	Waivers	December 19, 2025
(Denmark) Osvald Søe	17	DF	(Denmark) B.93	Transfer	January 9, 2026
(United States) Bryce Duke	21	MF	(Canada) CF Montréal	Free	February 9, 2026
(Ivory Coast) Bryan Zamblé	14	FW	(Ghana) Right to Dream Academy	Free	February 19, 2026
(United States) Ian Murphy	32	DF	(United States) Colorado Rapids	Trade	June 27, 2026
(Brazil) Gabriel Pirani	12	MF	(United States) D.C. United	Trade	July 9, 2026
(Tunisia) Elias Achouri	99	FW	(Denmark) FC Copenhagen	Transfer	July 24, 2026
(Denmark) Marcus Alstrup	16	GK	(United States) Austin FC II	Free	July 24, 2026
(Iceland) Dagur Dan Þórhallsson	3	DF	(Canada) CF Montréal	Trade	July 24, 2026
(Cameroon) David Mimbang		MF	(Denmark) Nordsjælland	Loan	September 2, 2026
(United States) Sam Vines	23	DF	(United States) Houston Dynamo FC	Loan	September 2, 2026
(Democratic Republic of the Congo) Cédric Bakambu	94	FW	(Spain) Real Betis	Free	September 3, 2026

=== Out ===
Outgoing transfers for San Diego FC
Player	No.	Pos.	New team	Notes	Date
(Norway) Heine Gikling Bruseth	16	MF	(Norway) Kristiansund BK	Free	January 7, 2026
(Argentina) Franco Negri	22	DF	(United States) Houston Dynamo FC	Free	January 27, 2026
(Northern Ireland) Paddy McNair	17	DF	(England) Hull City	Transfer	January 28, 2026
(Colombia) Tomás Ángel	9	FW	(Colombia) América de Cali	Transfer	February 27, 2026
(Mexico) Hirving Lozano	11	FW	(United States) LA Galaxy	Loan	August 7, 2026
(Colombia) Andrés Reyes	4	DF	(Colombia) Atlético Nacional	Transfer	August 8, 2026
(United States) Wilson Eisner	22	DF	(United States) FC Tulsa	Loan	August 14, 2026
(Tunisia) Anisse Saidi	29	FW	(Portugal) Benfica	Loan	August 22, 2026
(United States) Luca Bombino	27	DF	(England) Stoke City	Transfer	September 1, 2026
(Scotland) Lewis Morgan	9	FW	(Canada) Toronto FC	Trade	September 2, 2026
(United States) Bryce Duke	21	MF	(New Zealand) Wellington Phoenix	Free	September 15, 2026
