= Alex Mighten =

American-English footballer (born 2002)

Personal information
- Full name: Alexander Cole Mighten
- Date of birth: 11 April 2002 (age 24)
- Place of birth: West Hartford, Connecticut, United States
- Height: 1.72 m (5 ft 8 in)
- Position: Winger

Youth career
- –2009: Arnold Town
- 2009–2019: Nottingham Forest

Senior career*
Years	Team	Apps	(Gls)
2019–2024	Nottingham Forest	56	(4)
2022–2023	→ Sheffield Wednesday (loan)	9	(1)
2023–2024	→ KV Kortrijk (loan)	10	(0)
2024	→ Port Vale (loan)	10	(0)
2024–2026	San Diego FC	39	(1)
2024	→ Nordsjælland (loan)	0	(0)

International career
2016	England U15		
2017	England U16	9	(1)
2017–2019	England U17	7	(2)
2019	England U18	9	(4)
2021	England U20	1	(0)
- * Club domestic league appearances and goals as of 21:08, 11 September 2026 (UTC)

Alexander Cole Mighten (born 11 April 2002) is a professional footballer who plays as a winger. Born in the United States, he represented England at youth international level.

Mighten joined Nottingham Forest from Arnold Town in 2009 and made his professional debut in September 2019. He was an unused substitute in the 2022 EFL Championship play-off final and made his Premier League debut in August of that year. He joined League One side Sheffield Wednesday on loan for the first half of the 2022–23 season and spent the first half of the 2023–24 season on loan at Belgian club KV Kortrijk, before being loaned to Port Vale for the second half of the campaign. He signed with San Diego FC of Major League Soccer in August 2024 and was immediately loaned out to Danish club Nordsjælland.

== Early and personal life ==
Alexander Cole Mighten was born on 11 April 2002 in West Hartford, Connecticut, United States, while his father, Eddie Mighten, worked for ESPN. His family returned to Nottingham, England when he was three years old. His brother, David, played college soccer at Medaille College in Buffalo, New York.

== Club career ==
=== Nottingham Forest ===
Mighten joined the Nottingham Forest academy in 2009 after previously playing for Arnold Town. During his development in the club's Academy, Mighten received support from former Forest players Des Walker and David Johnson, as well as from Academy manager Gary Brazil. On 24 September 2019, Mighten made his professional debut when he appeared as a 78th-minute substitute during a 5–0 loss in an EFL Cup fixture at Arsenal. He signed his first professional contract three months later. He then made his first start for the Reds on 5 January 2020, in a 2–0 defeat to Chelsea in an FA Cup match; Mighten impressed in the game, winning a penalty for Forest only for it to be ruled out by a marginal VAR decision. He made his league debut on 22 February, in a 0–0 draw with Queens Park Rangers at the City Ground. He went on to make a total of eight Championship appearances by the end of the 2019–20 season.

In August 2020, Mighten signed a new contract extension to keep him at the club until June 2025. He scored his first professional goal in a 1–1 draw at Millwall on 19 December. He scored further goals against Blackburn Rovers and Queens Park Rangers, ending the 2020–21 campaign with three goals in 27 appearances as he saw gametime under both Sabri Lamouchi and Chris Hughton. Supporters named him the club's Young Player of the Season. He again played 27 games in the 2021–22 season, this time scoring once against Swansea City, and also featured once in the play-off semi-finals and was an unused substitute in the play-off final win over Huddersfield Town at Wembley Stadium.

On 29 August 2022, Mighten joined League One club Sheffield Wednesday on a season-long loan. He made his debut a day later against Bradford City in the EFL Trophy, playing 80 minutes. His first goal at Hillsborough came against Morecambe in the FA Cup. He returned to Nottingham Forest on 10 January 2023 having played 14 times and scoring two goals, at times playing out of position at wing-back and centre-forward. Wednesday decided to end the loan as they were contributing a significant portion of the player's wages, much to Forest manager Steve Cooper's frustration. As Mighten had already played for Forest and Wednesday in the 2022–23 season, this left him unable to join another club on loan and gametime for Forest in the Premier League was an unreaslitic prospect. Wednesday manager Darren Moore said that "it was one of the hardest decisions that I have had to make since becoming a manager".

On 5 September 2023, Mighten moved on a season-long loan to KV Kortrijk, who were bottom of the Belgian Pro League. He featured 12 times in all competitions during a four-month stay at the Guldensporen Stadion. However, eight of his league appearances were from the substitute bench. After being recalled by Forest on 9 January 2024, Mighten remained in Nottingham until transfer deadline day, when he was loaned to League One side Port Vale for the remainder of the 2023–24 season. David Flitcroft, the club's director of football, said that "we look forward to watching Alex grow both on and off the pitch throughout his time with the club and with Andy Crosby's team". However, Mighten missed four weeks due to a foot injury picked up in mid-March.

=== San Diego FC ===
On 30 August 2024, Mighten signed with Major League Soccer side San Diego FC ahead of their inaugural season in 2025. Sporting director Tyler Heaps described his "unique and special qualities". The following day he joined Danish Superliga club Nordsjælland on loan for the remainder of the calendar year. Following the 2026 season, San Diego declined to renew his contract.

== International career ==
Mighten first represented England at under-15 level. He scored a hat-trick against Australia for the under-18 team. Mighten received his first call-up to the under-19 squad in March 2021. On 6 September 2021, Mighten made his debut for the under-20 side in a 6–1 victory over Romania at St. George's Park. As Mighten was born in Hartford, Connecticut, United States, he is also eligible to represent the United States.

== Style of play ==
A versatile player, his main position is as a winger, where he utilises his extreme pace and one-on-one ability.

== Career statistics ==
As of match played 26 April 2026

Appearances and goals by club, season and competition
Club	Season	League			National cup (Note: Includes FA Cup, Belgian Cup, Danish Cup, U.S. Open Cup)		League cup (Note: Includes EFL Cup)		Other		Total	
Club	Season	Division	Apps	Goals	Apps	Goals	Apps	Goals	Apps	Goals	Apps	Goals
Nottingham Forest	2019–20	Championship	8	0	1	0	1	0	—		10	0
Nottingham Forest	2020–21	Championship	24	3	2	0	1	0	—		27	3
Nottingham Forest	2021–22	Championship	23	1	1	0	2	0	1 (Note: Appearances in play-offs)	0	27	1
Nottingham Forest	2022–23	Premier League	1	0	—		2	0	—		3	0
Nottingham Forest	2023–24	Premier League	0	0	0	0	0	0	—		0	0
Nottingham Forest	2024–25	Premier League	0	0	0	0	0	0	—		0	0
Nottingham Forest	Total		56	4	4	0	6	0	1	0	67	4
Sheffield Wednesday (loan)	2022–23	League One	9	1	2	1	—		3 (Note: Appearances in EFL Trophy)	0	14	2
KV Kortrijk (loan)	2023–24	Belgian Pro League	10	0	2	0	—		—		12	0
Port Vale (loan)	2023–24	League One	10	0	—		—		—		10	0
Nordsjælland (loan)	2024–25	Danish Superliga	0	0	0	0	—		—		0	0
San Diego FC	2025	Major League Soccer	27	1	0	0	—		—		27	1
San Diego FC	2026	Major League Soccer	6	0	0	0	—		—		6	0
San Diego FC	Total		33	1	0	0	0	0	0	0	33	1
Career totals			118	6	8	1	6	0	4	0	136	7

== Honours ==
Nottingham Forest

- EFL Championship play-offs: 2022
