= Osvald Søe =

Danish footballer (born 2005)

Personal information
- Full name: Osvald Gabriel Søe
- Date of birth: 7 March 2005 (age 21)
- Place of birth: Copenhagen, Denmark
- Height: 1.90 m (6 ft 3 in)
- Position: Defender

Team information
- Current team: San Diego FC
- Number: 17

Youth career
- –2020: FC Copenhagen
- 2020–2021: SfB-Oure FA
- 2021–2022: B.93

Senior career*
Years	Team	Apps	(Gls)
2022–2025	B.93	48	(1)
2026–	San Diego FC	15	(1)

International career^{‡}
2024	Denmark U19	4	(0)
- * Club domestic league appearances and goals as of 3 February 2026 ‡ National team caps and goals as of 22 May 2024

Osvald Gabriel Søe (born 7 March 2005) is a Danish professional footballer who plays as a defender for San Diego FC.

== Club career ==
As a youth player, Søe joined the youth academy of Danish side FC Copenhagen. Following his stint there, he joined the youth academy of Danish side SfB-Oure FA.

One year later, he joined the youth academy of Danish side Boldklubben af 1893 and was promoted to the club's senior team in 2022, where he made forty-eight league appearances and scored one goal and helped the club achieve promotion from the third tier to the second tier. German news website Transfermarkt wrote in 2026 that he "was considered one of the brightest talents playing in Denmark’s second division" while playing for them. Ahead of the 2026 season, he signed for American side San Diego FC.

== International career ==
Søe is a Denmark youth international. During the spring of 2024, he played for the Denmark national under-19 football team for 2024 UEFA European Under-19 Championship qualification.

== Style of play ==
Søe plays as a defender. Known for his strength, he is also known for his jumping ability.
