= Dagur Dan Þórhallsson =

Icelandic footballer (born 2000)

- Dagur with San Diego FC in 2026

Personal information
- Full name: Dagur Dan Þórhallsson
- Date of birth: 2 May 2000 (age 26)
- Place of birth: Hafnarfjörður, Iceland
- Height: 5 ft 10 in (1.78 m)
- Positions: Right-back; midfielder

Team information
- Current team: San Diego FC
- Number: 3

Youth career
- –2013: Fylkir
- 2013–2017: Haukar
- 2017–2018: Gent

Senior career*
| Years | Team | Apps | (Gls) |
| 2016 | Haukar | 6 | (0) |
| 2018–2019 | Keflavík | 16 | (1) |
| 2019 | → Mjøndalen (loan) | 1 | (0) |
| 2019–2020 | Mjøndalen | 12 | (0) |
| 2019 | → Kvik Halden (loan) | 12 | (5) |
| 2021 | → Fylkir (loan) | 20 | (1) |
| 2022 | Breiðablik | 25 | (9) |
| 2023–2025 | Orlando City | 92 | (7) |
| 2026 | CF Montréal | 10 | (1) |
| 2026– | San Diego FC | 9 | (0) |

International career^{‡}
| 2016 | Iceland U16 | 9 | (0) |
| 2016 | Iceland U17 | 3 | (0) |
| 2017 | Iceland U18 | 3 | (2) |
| 2018 | Iceland U19 | 5 | (0) |
| 2019–2022 | Iceland U21 | 8 | (0) |
| 2022– | Iceland | 10 | (0) |
- * Club domestic league appearances and goals as of 21:05, 31 October 2026 (UTC) ‡ National team caps and goals as of 03:59, 10 June 2026 (UTC)

Dagur Dan Þórhallsson (born 2 May 2000) is an Icelandic professional footballer who plays as a right-back or midfielder for Major League Soccer club San Diego FC and the Iceland national team.

== Club career ==
Born in Hafnarfjörður, Dagur spent time in the Fylkir youth ranks before joining the Haukar academy in 2013. He made his senior debut with Haukar on 12 September 2016, starting and playing the full 90 minutes of a 1–1 draw with HK in the 2016 1. deild karla. He made six appearances for the club before leaving to join the youth ranks of Belgian Pro League club Gent. He returned to Icelandic football with Keflavík in 2018, playing in the Úrvalsdeild. In the first half of 2019 he was loaned to Mjøndalen in Norway's top flight, making one league appearance and a further four in the cup before joining Mjøndalen permanently in the summer. He was immediately loaned out for the remainder of the 2019 season to third tier team Kvik Halden where he played regularly, scoring five goals in 12 league appearances as the team reached the promotion playoffs. In 2021, Dagur returned to Iceland on loan from Mjøndalen, joining Fylkir for the 2021 Úrvalsdeild season. Ahead of the 2022 season he made a permanent transfer to Breiðablik.

In January 2023, Dagur signed a two-year contract with two additional club option years with Major League Soccer club Orlando City. Dagur was named to the Team of the Matchday for the first time in his career for his performance in a goalless draw with CF Montréal on 24 February. On 17 November 2025, the team exercised their 2026 contract option for Dagur.

On 10 December 2025, CF Montréal acquired Dagur in exchange for $500,000 in 2026 general allocation money with up to $125,000 in add-ons and a sell-on percentage. Dagur made his debut for CF Montréal in a 5–0 loss to San Diego FC on 21 February 2026. On 9 May, Dagur scored his first goal for CF Montréal, the second of a 2–0 win against his former club, Orlando City.

On 24 July 2026, Dagur was signed by San Diego FC through June 2028 in exchange for up to $500,000 in general allocation money and up to $125,000 in add-ons. Dagur provided an assist and scored his first goal for San Diego FC in a 3–2 win against Puebla in the Leagues Cup on 12 August.

== International career ==
=== Youth ===
Dagur has been capped for Iceland at all age-specific levels from under-16 to under-21. He appeared in 2017 UEFA European Under-17 Championship qualification and 2019 UEFA European Under-19 Championship qualification as Iceland failed to progress from the first qualifying stage both times. He made six appearances during 2023 UEFA European Under-21 Championship qualification as Iceland reached the play-off round. He started both playoff games as Iceland lost 2–1 on aggregate to Czech Republic.

=== Senior ===
Dagur received his first senior international call-up for Iceland in November 2022 for a pair of friendlies against Saudi Arabia and South Korea. Played outside of a FIFA window, the squad was a chance for manager Arnar Viðarsson to work with domestic players and those from other leagues not active in November. He made his debut on 6 November 2022, starting and playing the full 90 minutes in a 1–0 defeat to Saudi Arabia in Abu Dhabi. After missing the 2022 Baltic Cup, he returned to the squad in January 2023 for friendlies against Estonia and Sweden, starting both.

== Style of play ==
Dagur has experience playing in various field positions, including as a right-back and as a multi-positional midfielder.

== Personal life ==
Dagur is the son of former international footballer Þórhallur Dan Jóhannsson. On 1 December 2024, Dagur and his partner Friðrika Arnardóttir announced on Instagram that they were having a child together.

== Career statistics ==
=== Club ===
As of match played 31 October 2026

Appearances and goals by club, season and competition
| Club | Season | League | | | National cup (Note: Icelandic Cup, Norwegian Cup, U.S. Open Cup, and Canadian Championship) | | League cup (Note: Icelandic League Cup and MLS Cup Playoffs) | | Continental | | Other | | Total | |
| Club | Season | Division | Apps | Goals | Apps | Goals | Apps | Goals | Apps | Goals | Apps | Goals | Apps | Goals |
|---|---|---|---|---|---|---|---|---|---|---|---|---|---|---|
| Haukar | 2016 | 1. deild karla | 6 | 0 | 0 | 0 | 0 | 0 | — | | — | | 6 | 0 |
| Keflavík | 2018 | Úrvalsdeild | 16 | 1 | 0 | 0 | 0 | 0 | — | | — | | 16 | 1 |
| Mjøndalen (loan) | 2019 | Eliteserien | 1 | 0 | 4 | 0 | — | | — | | — | | 5 | 0 |
| Mjøndalen | 2020 | Eliteserien | 12 | 0 | 0 | 0 | — | | — | | — | | 12 | 0 |
| Mjøndalen | Total | | 13 | 0 | 4 | 0 | 0 | 0 | 0 | 0 | 0 | 0 | 17 | 0 |
| Kvik Halden (loan) | 2019 | 2. divisjon | 12 | 5 | 0 | 0 | — | | — | | 2 (Note: 2019 2. divisjon promotion playoffs) | 0 | 14 | 5 |
| Fylkir (loan) | 2021 | Úrvalsdeild | 20 | 1 | 3 | 0 | 0 | 0 | — | | — | | 23 | 1 |
| Breiðablik | 2022 | Besta deild karla | 25 | 9 | 4 | 0 | 5 | 2 | 3 (Note: UEFA Europa Conference League) | 0 | 1 (Note: Icelandic Super Cup) | 0 | 38 | 11 |
| Orlando City | 2023 | Major League Soccer | 30 | 2 | 1 | 0 | 3 | 0 | 2 (Note: CONCACAF Champions League) | 0 | 3 (Note: Appearances in Leagues Cup) | 0 | 39 | 2 |
| Orlando City | 2024 | Major League Soccer | 31 | 2 | — | | 5 | 0 | 3 | 0 | 3 | 1 | 42 | 3 |
| Orlando City | 2025 | Major League Soccer | 31 | 3 | 2 | 1 | 0 | 0 | — | | 2 | 0 | 35 | 4 |
| Orlando City | Total | | 92 | 7 | 3 | 1 | 8 | 0 | 5 | 0 | 7 | 1 | 116 | 9 |
| CF Montréal | 2026 | Major League Soccer | 10 | 1 | 1 | 0 | — | | — | | 0 | 0 | 11 | 1 |
| San Diego FC | 2026 | Major League Soccer | 9 | 0 | — | | — | | — | | 2 | 1 | 11 | 1 |
| Career total | | | 203 | 24 | 15 | 1 | 13 | 2 | 8 | 0 | 12 | 2 | 250 | 29 |

=== International ===
As of match played 8 June 2026

Appearances and goals by national team and year
| National team | Year | Apps | Goals |
|---|---|---|---|
| Iceland | 2022 | 2 | 0 |
| Iceland | 2023 | 2 | 0 |
| Iceland | 2024 | 2 | 0 |
| Iceland | 2025 | 1 | 0 |
| Iceland | 2026 | 3 | 0 |
| Total | | 10 | 0 |
