= Kieran Sargeant =

American soccer player (born 2003)

- Sargeant with San Diego FC in 2026

Personal information
- Full name: Kieran Sargeant
- Date of birth: May 15, 2003 (age 23)
- Place of birth: Houston, Texas, United States
- Height: 6 ft 0 in (1.83 m)
- Position: Left-back

Team information
- Current team: San Diego FC
- Number: 5

Youth career
- 2017–2021: Houston Dynamo

College career
Years	Team	Apps	(Gls)
2021–2023	Georgetown Hoyas	60	(4)

Senior career*
Years	Team	Apps	(Gls)
2024–2025	Houston Dynamo	0	(0)
2024	Houston Dynamo 2	25	(1)
2025	→ Lexington SC (loan)	27	(0)
2026–	San Diego FC	13	(1)
- * Club domestic league appearances and goals

Kieran Sargeant (born May 15, 2003) is an American professional soccer player who plays as a defender for Major League Soccer side San Diego FC.

== Youth & College career ==
Sargeant was part of the Houston Dynamo academy for four years, before attending Georgetown University to play college soccer in 2021. In three seasons with the Hoyas, Sargeant made 60 appearances, scoring four goals and tallying 15 assists. At college, Sargeant was a United Soccer Coaches Second Team All-America selection, and was named First Team All-East Region as well. He was also a First Team All-BIG EAST honoree.

== Professional career ==
=== Houston Dynamo ===
On January 15, 2024, Sargeant left college a year early to sign a homegrown player deal with Houston Dynamo. He spent the 2024 season with the club's MLS Next Pro team, and then was loaned to USL Championship side Lexington SC for the entire 2025 season.

=== San Diego FC ===
On December 18, 2025 San Diego FC acquired Sargeant's MLS rights in exchange for their natural third-round pick in the 2026 MLS SuperDraft and up to an additional $50,000 in Conditional General Allocation Money for the 2027 season.
