= Tyler Heaps =

American soccer executive (born 1991)

Personal information
- Date of birth: April 21, 1991 (age 35)
- Height: 5 ft 10 in (1.78 m)
- Position: Defender

Team information
- Current team: San Diego FC (sporting director)

Youth career
- Bangu Tsunami
- Minnesota Thunder Academy

College career
Years	Team	Apps	(Gls)
2009	North Park Vikings	–	(–)
2010–2012	Augsburg Auggies	57	(1)

Senior career*
Years	Team	Apps	(Gls)
2014	Minnesota United Reserves	–	(–)

Managerial career
- 2014–2015: Saint Katherine Firebirds (assistant)
- 2016–2021: United States Soccer Federation (manager of analytics and research)
- 2021–2023: AS Monaco (head of analytics)
- 2023: Right to Dream Academy (head of recruitment and insight)
- 2024–: San Diego FC (sporting director)
- * Club domestic league appearances and goals

Tyler Heaps (born April 21, 1991) is an American soccer executive and former player who is the sporting director of Major League Soccer club San Diego FC. Heaps played college soccer for the North Park Vikings and the Augsburg Auggies before spending a stint with the Minnesota United Reserves. He has previously worked as the head of analytics for the United States Soccer Federation and AS Monaco, and as the head of recruitment and insight for the Right to Dream Academy.

== Early life ==
Heaps grew up in the eastern part of Saint Paul, Minnesota, as the youngest of five children raised by single mother Paula Heaps. Money was often tight in the Heaps household, with Heaps having to work concessions at Minnesota Twins games as a child alongside his mother in order to collect enough money for club soccer. He first joined Bangu Tsunami FC before eventually switching to the Minnesota Thunder Academy. Heaps attended DeLaSalle High School, where he was an all-conference honoree in each of his four years of soccer. He also spent two years playing football, two years participating in track and three years playing basketball. He graduated as a member of the National Honor Society.

== College career ==
Heaps started playing college soccer for the North Park Vikings in Chicago. He transferred to Augsburg University ahead of the 2010 season and spent the remaining three years of his collegiate career as a defender for the Auggies. After playing 21 games in his first year with the Auggies, he made 18 appearances in each of his junior and senior seasons. As a senior in 2012, he recorded Augsburg career-highs for himself in both goals and assists. He also departed from the program with one set of Academic All-MIAC honors.

== Club career ==
In 2014, Heaps played for the Minnesota United Reserves in the National Premier Soccer League. At the same time, he took a job as an assistant coach for the Saint Katherine Firebirds soccer team. Heaps balanced both his Minnesota United and Saint Katherine responsibilities with working a day job in the finance industry. He ended his playing career after one season.

== Executive career ==
The United States Soccer Federation hired Heaps in 2016, joining the organization's burgeoning analytics department. Heaps had been previously inspired to the field of analytics after viewing the film Moneyball. He eventually rose to become the USSF's head of analytics, working with both the United States men's national team and women's national team; part of his responsibilities included coding and building player evaluation algorithms. He was an analyst for the women's national team that won the 2019 FIFA Women's World Cup. He spent a total of five years with the USSF before departing in 2021.

Heaps then spent three seasons as the head of analytics for French Ligue 1 club AS Monaco, working to improve Monaco's recruitment, performance and sporting strategy systems. His efforts helped the club twice qualify for the UEFA Europa League and end the 2021–22 season in third place despite having finished in 17th the year prior.

In 2023, Heaps joined the Right to Dream Academy youth development system. In his sole year at Right to Dream, he worked as the head of recruitment and insight and helped build FC Nordsjælland's first-team recruitment strategy.

On August 15, 2024, Major League Soccer expansion club San Diego FC (also connected to the Right to Dream Academy) announced the appointment of Heaps as the club's sporting director and general manager. Heaps, 33 years old at the time of his hiring, became the youngest sporting director in the MLS. He proceeded to orchestrate the construction of San Diego FC's inaugural roster and soccer operations department, including the appointment of head coach Mikey Varas. Under Heaps' leadership, San Diego FC set league records for points and victories and advanced to the conference final in its first season. In February 2026, Heaps signed a three-year contract extension with the club, lasting until 2029.

== Personal life ==
Heaps graduated from Augsburg University with a major in mathematics and minor in computer science. He had initially planned on studying chemistry, but soon discovered a dislike for the subject and switched majors.

He is married to Lindsey Heaps (formerly Horan), midfielder and captain for the United States women's national soccer team. They met when he was an employee of US Soccer and had to fill in as a player during a USWNT training session. The couple announced their engagement in June 2023 before getting married in Colorado in December of the following year.
