= Bryan Zamblé =

Ivorian footballer (born 2008)

- Zamblé in 2026

Personal information
- Full name: Bi Voli Bryan Christian Zamblé
- Date of birth: February 19, 2008 (age 18)
- Place of birth: Abidjan, Ivory Coast
- Height: 5 ft 5 in (1.65 m)
- Position: Winger

Team information
- Current team: San Diego FC
- Number: 14

Youth career
- 2019–2026: Right to Dream Academy

Senior career*
Years	Team	Apps	(Gls)
2026–	San Diego FC	9	(2)

International career^{‡}
2024	Ivory Coast U16	2	(0)
- Ivory Coast U17
- * Club domestic league appearances and goals as of 14 September 2026 ‡ National team caps and goals as of 10 September 2026

Bi Voli Bryan Christian Zamblé (born 19 February 2008) is an Ivorian professional footballer who plays as a winger for Major League Soccer side San Diego FC.

== Youth ==
=== Right to Dream Academy ===
Zamblé joined the Right to Dream Academy in Ghana when he was 11-years old, featuring for the Right to Dream International Academy. Zamblé had the option to join Danish side FC Nordsjaelland, but opted to move to the United States instead.

== Professional career ==
=== San Diego FC ===
On 19 February 2026, Zamblé signed a one-year deal with Major League Soccer side San Diego FC, with the club holding contract options through to the 2029–30 season. Just two days later on 21 February 2026, Zamblé appeared as an 81st-minute substitute against CF Montréal and scored his first professional goal in a 5–0 win. He scored his first goal in the Leagues Cup, netting the winning goal in a 1–0 victory over Club Tijuana.
