= Oscar Verhoeven =

American soccer player (born 2006)

- Verhoeven with San Diego FC in 2026

Personal information
- Full name: Oscar Anthony Verhoeven
- Date of birth: May 31, 2006 (age 20)
- Place of birth: Pleasant Hill, California, US
- Height: 6 ft 0 in (1.83 m)
- Position: Right-back

Team information
- Current team: San Diego FC
- Number: 33

Youth career
- San Jose Earthquakes

Senior career*
Years	Team	Apps	(Gls)
2023–2025	San Jose Earthquakes	7	(0)
2023–2024	→ The Town FC (loan)	33	(0)
2025	→ San Diego FC (loan)	14	(0)
2026–	San Diego FC	0	(0)

International career^{‡}
2022	United States U16	3	(0)
2022–2023	United States U17	19	(0)
2024–	United States U20	1	(0)
- * Club domestic league appearances and goals as of 22:58, December 11, 2025 (UTC) ‡ National team caps and goals as of 15:54, October 21, 2024 (UTC)

Oscar Anthony Verhoeven (born May 31, 2006) is an American professional soccer player who plays as a right-back for Major League Soccer club San Diego FC.

== Club career ==
On May 17, 2023, Verhoeven signed a professional contract with the San Jose Earthquakes until 2025, with an option to extend until 2027. He began his senior career with their reserve team, The Town FC in the MLS Next Pro in 2023. He made his senior and professional debut with the San Jose Earthquakes in a 4–3 U.S. Open Cup loss to Sacramento Republic FC on May 21, 2024.

On April 21, 2025, Verhoeven was loaned to San Diego FC for the remainder of the 2025 season in exchange for $100,000 in general allocation money. On November 19, San Diego FC opted to sign Verhoeven in exchange for $350,000 in additional general allocation money.

== International career ==
Verhoeven is a youth international for the United States. He was part of the United States U17s that came in second for the 2023 CONCACAF U-17 Championship. He also made the U17 squad for the 2023 FIFA U-17 World Cup.
