= 2023 CF Montréal season =

Canadian Major League Soccer team

CF Montréal
2023 season
- Owner: Joey Saputo
- Head coach: Hernán Losada
- Stadium: Saputo Stadium
- Major League Soccer: Conference: 10th Overall: 20th
- MLS Cup playoffs: Did not qualify
- Canadian Championship: Runners-up
- Leagues Cup: Group stage
- Top goalscorer: League: Mathieu Choinière (5); All: Mathieu Choinière; Sunusi Ibrahim (6 each)
- Highest home attendance: 23,352 (March 16 v. Philadelphia Union, MLS)
- Lowest home attendance: 10,062 (May 24 v. Forge FC, Canadian Championship)
- Average home league attendance: 17,552
- Biggest win: 4–0 (June 10 v. Minnesota United FC, MLS)
- Biggest defeat: 0–5 (April 1 v. Vancouver Whitecaps FC, MLS)
Home colours	Away colours

The 2023 CF Montréal season was the club's 30th season of existence, and their 12th in Major League Soccer, the top tier of the American soccer pyramid.

In addition to competing in MLS, the club also played in the Canadian Championship and the Leagues Cup.

== Squad ==
Source, As of September 18, 2023:

No.	Player	Nationality	Position	Date of birth (age at year end)	Previous club
Goalkeepers
1	Logan Ketterer	USA	GK	November 9, 1993 (age 32)	(United States) El Paso Locomotive FC
40	Jonathan Sirois	CAN	GK	July 27, 2001 (age 25)	(Canada) Montreal Impact Academy
41	James Pantemis	CAN	GK	February 21, 1997 (age 29)	(Canada) Montreal Impact Academy
Defenders
4	Fernando Álvarez	COL	CB	August 24, 2003 (age 23)	(Mexico) C.F. Pachuca
15	Zachary Brault-Guillard	CAN	RB	December 30, 1998 (age 27)	(France) Lyon
16	Joel Waterman	CAN	CB	January 24, 1996 (age 30)	(Canada) Cavalry FC
22	Aaron Herrera	GUA	WB	June 6, 1997 (age 29)	(United States) Real Salt Lake
24	George Campbell	USA	CB	June 22, 2001 (age 25)	(United States) Atlanta United FC
25	Gabriele Corbo	ITA	CB	January 11, 2000 (age 26)	(Italy) Bologna
26	Róbert Thorkelsson	ISL	CB	April 3, 2002 (age 24)	(Iceland) Breiðablik
Midfielders
2	Victor Wanyama	KEN	DM	June 25, 1991 (age 35)	(England) Tottenham Hotspur
6	Samuel Piette	CAN	DM	November 12, 1994 (age 31)	(Spain) CD Izarra
7	Ahmed Hamdy	EGY	CM	February 10, 1998 (age 28)	(Egypt) El Gouna FC
10	Bryce Duke	USA	CM	February 28, 2001 (age 25)	(United States) Inter Miami CF
19	Nathan Saliba	CAN	CM	February 7, 2004 (age 22)	(Canada) Montreal Impact Academy
23	Ousman Jabang	USA	DM	March 29, 2001 (age 25)	(United States) Mercer Bears
27	Sean Rea	CAN	CM	May 15, 2002 (age 24)	(Canada) Montreal Impact Academy
29	Mathieu Choinière	CAN	AM	February 7, 1999 (age 27)	(Canada) Montreal Impact Academy
Attackers
9	Chinonso Offor	NGA	FW	May 27, 2000 (age 26)	(United States) Chicago Fire FC
11	Ariel Lassiter	CRC	FW	September 27, 1994 (age 32)	(United States) Inter Miami CF
13	Mason Toye	USA	FW	October 16, 1998 (age 28)	(United States) Minnesota United FC
14	Sunusi Ibrahim	NGA	FW	October 1, 2002 (age 24)	(Nigeria) Nasarawa United F.C.
17	Jojea Kwizera	COD	FW	January 1, 1999 (age 27)	(United States) Utah Valley Wolverines
21	Lassi Lappalainen	FIN	FW	August 24, 1998 (age 28)	(Italy) Bologna
28	Jules-Anthony Vilsaint	CAN	FW	January 6, 2003 (age 23)	(Belgium) Royal Antwerp F.C.
30	Romell Quioto	HON	FW	August 9, 1991 (age 35)	(United States) Houston Dynamo
90	Kwadwo Opoku	GHA	FW	July 13, 2001 (age 25)	(United States) Los Angeles FC

=== International roster slots ===
Montreal currently has six MLS International Roster Slots for use in the 2023 season. Montreal has eight slots allotted from the league and sold two to St. Louis City SC & Los Angeles FC. In addition, starting in 2022, CF Montreal are allowed to make three international players exempt from status if they have been on the roster for more than one year.

CF Montréal International slots
Slot	Player	Nationality
Exempt	Lassi Lappalainen	Finland
Exempt	Victor Wanyama	Kenya
Exempt	Ahmed Hamdy	Egypt
1	Sunusi Ibrahim	Nigeria
2	Róbert Thorkelsson	Iceland
3	Chinonso Offor	Nigeria
4	Gabriele Corbo	Italy
5	Kwadwo Opoku	Ghana
6	Vacant	

Foreign-Born Players with Domestic Status
Player	Nationality
Romell Quioto	Honduras ^{G}
Fernando Álvarez	Colombia / (United States) USA
Jojea Kwizera	(Democratic Republic of the Congo) / (United States) USA
Ariel Lassiter	(Costa Rica) / (United States) USA
Aaron Herrera	(Guatemala) / (United States) USA
Zachary Brault-Guillard	Haiti / Canada
Jules-Anthony Vilsaint	Haiti / Canada
Jean-Aniel Assi	Ivory Coast / Canada
Ilias Iliadis	Greece / Canada

- (Canada) – Player is Canadian citizen;
- (United States) – Player is US citizen;
- G – Player has US green card;
- C – Player has permanent Canadian residency.

== Management ==
As of January 14, 2023

- (Canada) Joey Saputo – Owner
- (Canada) Gabriel Gervais – President and Chief Executive Officer
- (Belgium) Olivier Renard – Vice president and Chief Sporting Officer
- (Canada) Salvatore Rivera – Vice-president & Chief Financial Officer
- (Canada) Amélie Vaillancourt – Vice-president & Chief Human Resource Officer
- (Canada) Samia Chebeir – Vice-president and Chief Marketing Officer
- (Canada) Daniel Pozzi – Director, 1st Team Operations

== Coaching staff ==
As of January 9, 2023

- (Argentina) Hernán Losada – head coach
- (Belgium) Laurent Ciman – assistant coach
- (Argentina) Sebastián Setti – assistant coach
- (Cuba) Eduardo Sebrango – assistant manager
- (France) Hervé Diese – assistant manager
- (France) Romuald Peiser – goalkeeping coach
- (France) Barthélémy Delecroix – fitness Coach
- (Italy) Stefano Pasquali – assistant fitness Coach
- (France) Louan Schlicht – video Analyst
- (Italy) Luca Bucci – responsible for the goalkeeping development methodology

== Player movement ==
=== In ===
Per Major League Soccer and club policies terms of the deals do not get disclosed.

No.	Pos.	Player	Transferred from	Fee/notes	Date	Source
24	DF	(United States) George Campbell	(United States) Atlanta United FC	$900,000 GAM	December 13, 2022	
22	DF	(Guatemala) Aaron Herrera	(United States) Real Salt Lake	$500,000 GAM	December 21, 2022	
5	MF	(Greece) Ilias Iliadis	(Greece) Panathinaikos F.C. B	Free Transfer	January 14, 2023	
28	FW	(Canada) Jules-Anthony Vilsaint	(Belgium) Royal Antwerp FC	Free Transfer	February 11, 2023	
23	MF	(United States) Ousman Jabang	(United States) Mercer Bears	MLS Super Draft	March 1, 2023	
25	DF	(Italy) Gabriele Corbo	(Italy) Bologna F.C. 1909	Transfer	March 20, 2023	
10	MF	(United States) Bryce Duke	(United States) Inter Miami CF	Traded for Kamal Miller & $1,300,000 GAM	April 12, 2023	
11	FW	(Costa Rica) Ariel Lassiter	(United States) Inter Miami CF	Traded for Kamal Miller & $1,300,000 GAM	April 12, 2023	
90	FW	(Ghana) Kwadwo Opoku	(United States) Los Angeles FC	$1,650,000 GAM	July 5, 2023	
4	DF	(Colombia) Fernando Álvarez	(Mexico) C.F. Pachuca	Transfer Fee	July 28, 2023	

=== Out ===
No.	Pos.	Player	Transferred to	Fee/notes	Date	Source
8	MF	(United States) Djordje Mihailovic	(Netherlands) AZ Alkmaar	$5,000,000	August 24, 2022	
1	GK	(Canada) Sebastian Breza	(Italy) Bologna F.C. 1909	End of Loan	November 17, 2022	
19	DF	(Canada) Zorhan Bassong	(Romania) FC Argeș Pitești	Option declined	November 17, 2022	
24	DF	(Canada) Karifa Yao	(Canada) Vancouver Whitecaps FC	Option declined	November 17, 2022	
33	DF	(Canada) Keesean Ferdinand	(United States) Portland Timbers 2	Option declined	November 17, 2022	
34	MF	(Canada) Tomas Giraldo	(Canada) HFX Wanderers	Option declined	November 17, 2022	
9	FW	(Norway) Bjørn Maars Johnsen	(Netherlands) SC Cambuur	Option declined	November 17, 2022	
22	DF	(Canada) Alistair Johnston	(Scotland) Celtic	$3,000,000	December 3, 2022	
28	MF	(Canada) Ismaël Koné	(England) Watford F.C.	Transfer Fee	December 5, 2022	
10	FW	(Argentina) Joaquín Torres	(United States) Philadelphia Union	$800,000 in GAM	January 26, 2023	
23	FW	(Sierra Leone) Kei Kamara	(United States) Chicago Fire FC	$250,000 in GAM	February 24, 2023	
3	DF	(Canada) Kamal Miller	(United States) Inter Miami CF	Traded	April 12, 2023	
4	DF	(France) Rudy Camacho	(United States) Columbus Crew	$400,000 in GAM	July 31, 2023	
8	MF	(United States) Matko Miljevic	(Argentina) Newell's Old Boys	Contract Terminated	September 18, 2023	

=== Loans in ===
No.	Pos.	Player	Loaned from	Loan start date	Loan end date	Source

=== Loans out ===
No.	Pos.	Player	Loaned to	Loan start date	Loan end date	Source
9	FW	(Nigeria) Chinonso Offor	(Belgium) S.V. Zulte Waregem	September 7, 2022	January 31, 2023	
35	FW	(Canada) Jean-Aniel Assi	(Canada) Atlético Ottawa	February 15, 2023	December 31, 2023	
18	MF	(Canada) Rida Zouhir	(United States) San Antonio FC	April 25, 2023	December 31, 2023	
5	MF	(Greece) Ilias Iliadis	(Canada) Atlético Ottawa	July 28, 2023	December 31, 2023	

=== MLS SuperDraft picks ===
Round	No.	Pos.	Player	College/Club team	Transaction	Source
2	54	MF	(United States) Milo Garvanian	(United States) North Carolina Tar Heels	Released	
3	75	DF	(United States) Ousman Jabang	(United States) Mercer Bears	Signed	
3	83	GK	(Canada) Nick Christoffersen	(United States) Penn Quakers	Signed with Vermont Green FC	

== Friendlies ==
=== Pre-season ===
Unless otherwise noted, all times in EST

February 3, 2023 1	CF Montréal	6–1	PLSQ All-Stars	Montreal, QC
17:00	Saliba; Miller; Kei Kamara; Ibrahim; Quioto		Kwemi	Stadium: Olympic Stadium

February 8, 2023 2	CF Montréal	3–0	FIU Panthers	Fort Lauderdale, Florida
10:30	Lappalainen 23'; Quioto 40'; Zouhir 80'			Stadium: Lockhart Stadium

February 11, 2023 3	CF Montréal	2–2	Houston Dynamo FC	Fort Lauderdale, Florida
18:00	Rea; Ibrahim			Stadium: Lockhart Stadium

February 15, 2023 4	CF Montréal	2–1	Inter Miami CF	Fort Lauderdale, Florida
19:30	Quioto 3'; Saliba 31'		Ulloa 56'	Stadium: Lockhart Stadium

February 18, 2023 5	CF Montréal	1–1	Colorado Rapids 2	St. Petersburg, Florida
12:00				Stadium: Al Lang Stadium

February 18, 2023 6	CF Montréal	2–1	Tampa Bay Rowdies	St. Petersburg, Florida
19:30	Ibrahim; Offor			Stadium: Al Lang Stadium

Win Draw Loss

== Major League Soccer regular season ==
=== Tables ===
==== Eastern Conference ====
MLS Eastern Conference table (2023)
Pos	Team	Pld	W	L	T	GF	GA	GD	Pts	Qualification
8	New York Red Bulls	34	11	13	10	36	39	−3	43	Qualification for the wild card round
9	Charlotte FC	34	10	11	13	45	52	−7	43	Qualification for the wild card round
10	CF Montréal	34	12	17	5	36	52	−16	41	
11	New York City FC	34	9	11	14	35	39	−4	41	
12	D.C. United	34	10	14	10	45	49	−4	40	

Source: MLS
Rules for classification: 1) points; 2) total wins; 3) total goal differential; 4) total goals scored; 5) fewer disciplinary points; 6) away goal differential; 7) away goals scored; 8) home goals differential; 9) home goals scored; 10) coin toss (2 clubs tied) or drawing of lots (≥3 clubs tied)

==== Overall ====
Overall MLS standings table
Pos	Team	Pld	W	L	T	GF	GA	GD	Pts
18	Portland Timbers	34	11	13	10	46	58	−12	43
19	Charlotte FC	34	10	11	13	45	52	−7	43
20	CF Montréal	34	12	17	5	36	52	−16	41
21	Minnesota United FC	34	10	13	11	46	51	−5	41
22	New York City FC	34	9	11	14	35	39	−4	41

Source: MLS
Rules for classification: 1) points; 2) total wins; 3) total goal differential; 4) total goals scored; 5) fewer disciplinary points; 6) away goal differential; 7) away goals scored; 8) home goals differential; 9) home goals scored; 10) coin toss (2 clubs tied) or drawing of lots (≥3 clubs tied)

=== Results summary ===
Overall								Home						Away					
Pld	Pts	W	L	D	GF	GA	GD	W	L	D	GF	GA	GD	W	L	D	GF	GA	GD
34	41	12	17	5	36	52	−16	10	4	3	26	12	+14	2	13	2	10	40	−30

Last updated: October 23, 2023
Source: 2023 Major League Soccer season
Pld = Matches played; Pts = Points; W = Matches won; D = Matches drawn; L = Matches lost; GF = Goals for; GA = Goals against; GD = Goal difference

=== Matches ===
Win Draw Loss

February 25 1	Inter Miami CF	2–0	CF Montréal	Fort Lauderdale, FL
7:30 PM EDT	Kryvtsov 41'; Borgelin 76'	Report	Herrera (yellow card) 40'	Stadium: DRV PNK Stadium; Attendance: 17,655; Referee: Drew Fischer

March 4 2	Austin FC	1–0	CF Montréal	Austin, Texas
8:30 PM EDT	Wolff (yellow card) 22'; Urruti 88'	Report	Saliba (yellow card) 8'; Piette (yellow card) 57'	Stadium: Q2 Stadium; Attendance: 20,738; Referee: Lukasz Szpala

March 11 3	Nashville SC	2–0	CF Montréal	Nashville, TN
8:30 PM EDT	Shaffelburg 37'; Washington (yellow card) 67', (goal) 89'	Report	Wanyama (yellow card) 34'	Stadium: Geodis Park; Attendance: 25,958; Referee: Rubiel Vazquez

March 18 4	CF Montréal	3–2	Philadelphia Union	Montreal, QC
7:30 PM EDT	Quioto 3' (pen.), 90+8', (yellow card) 43'; Wanyama (yellow card) 18'; Zouhir (yellow card) 43'; Offor 90', (yellow card) 90+7'	Report	Glesnes (yellow card) 2'; Uhre 46', 60'; Carranza (yellow card) 58' (yellow-red card) 69'; Bedoya (yellow card) 90+6'	Stadium: Olympic Stadium; Attendance: 23,352; Referee: Nima Saghafi

April 1 5	Vancouver Whitecaps	5–0	CF Montréal	Vancouver, BC
10:30 PM EDT	White 38'; Becher 43', 59'; Gressel 45'; Ahmed 43'; Laborda (yellow card) 50'	Report	Camacho (yellow card) 11' (yellow-red card) 23'; Waterman (yellow card) 17'; Rea (yellow card) 52'	Stadium: BC Place; Attendance: 16,046; Referee: Timothy Ford

April 8 6	New England Revolution	4–0	CF Montréal	Foxborough, MA
7:30 PM EDT	Borrero 21'; Gil 45+4' (pen.); Wood 50'; Vrioni 86'	Report	Miller (yellow card) 26'; Corbo (yellow card) 45'; Wanyama (yellow card) 54'; Waterman (yellow card) 68'	Stadium: Gillette Stadium; Attendance: 18,021; Referee: Tori Penso

April 15 7	CF Montréal	0–1	D.C. United	Montreal, QC
7:30 PM EDT	Hamdi (yellow card) 25'; Iliadis (yellow card) 40'; Waterman (yellow card) 45+4'	Report	Pálsson (yellow card) 5'; O'Brien 46' (yellow card) 60'	Stadium: Saputo Stadium; Attendance: 16,039; Referee: Joseph Dickerson

April 22 8	CF Montréal	2–0	New York Red Bulls	Montreal, QC
7:30 PM EDT	Reyes 25' (o.g.); Corbo (yellow card) 26'; Iliadis (yellow card) 53' (yellow-red card) 65'; Choinière (yellow card) 59' (goal) 90+2'	Report	Edelman (yellow card) 2'; Duncan (yellow card) 62'; Reyes (yellow card) 71'	Stadium: Saputo Stadium; Attendance: 14,021; Referee: Rubiel Vazquez

April 29 9	Sporting Kansas City	0–2	CF Montréal	Kansas City, KS
8:30 PM EDT	Rosero (yellow card) 30'; Pulido (yellow card) 52'; Espinoza (yellow card) 57'	Report	Wanyama (yellow card) 27'; Duke 35'; Choinière 45+1' (yellow card) 90+6'; Waterman (yellow card) 65'	Stadium: Children's Mercy Park; Attendance: 18,226; Referee: Ramy Touchan

May 6 10	CF Montréal	2–0	Orlando City SC	Montreal, QC
7:30 PM EDT	Jansson 62' (o.g.); Quioto 66'; Camacho (yellow card) 79'; Waterman (yellow card) 83'	Report	Smith (yellow card) 23'; Halliday (yellow card) 41'; Araújo (yellow card) 74'; Enrique (yellow card) 76'; Felipe (yellow card) 89'	Stadium: Saputo Stadium; Attendance: 16,112; Referee: Marcos de Oliveira

May 13 11	CF Montréal	2–0	Toronto FC	Montreal, QC
7:30 PM EDT	Campbell (yellow card) 6'; Þorkelsson (yellow card) 24'; Herrera (yellow card) 40'; Lappalainen 53'; Offor 68'; Lassiter (yellow card) 88'	Report	Marshall-Rutty (yellow card) 26' (yellow-red card) 56'	Stadium: Saputo Stadium; Attendance: 19,619; Referee: Chris Penso

May 17 12	FC Cincinnati	3–0	CF Montréal	Cincinnati, OH
7:30 PM EDT	Waterman 2' (o.g.); Acosta 26'; Nwobodo (yellow card) 34'; Vazquez 65'	Report		Stadium: TQL Stadium; Attendance: 23,461; Referee: Mark Allatin

May 20 13	New York Red Bulls	2–1	CF Montréal	Harrison, NJ
7:30 PM EDT	Reyes 23'; Burke 38'; Cásseres (yellow card) 45+1'	Report	Camacho (yellow card) 16'; Waterman 29'; Duke (yellow card) 32'; Herrera (yellow card) 65'	Stadium: Red Bull Arena; Attendance: 13,436; Referee: Drew Fischer

May 27 14	CF Montréal	1–0	Inter Miami CF	Montreal, QC
7:30 PM EDT	Waterman (yellow card) 39'; Offor 53'; Rea (yellow card) 90+3'	Report	Kryvtsov (yellow card) 74'	Stadium: Saputo Stadium; Attendance: 19,619; Referee: Nima Saghafi

May 31 15	D.C. United	2–2	CF Montréal	Washington, DC
7:30 PM EDT	Pines 44'; Ku-DiPietro 59'; O'Brien (yellow card) 84'	Report	Duke (yellow card) 51'; Ibrahim 80'; Lassiter 82'	Stadium: Audi Field; Attendance: 16,342; Referee: Alex Chilowicz

June 3 16	Philadelphia Union	3–0	CF Montréal	Chester, PA
7:30 PM EDT	Carranza 12', 61'; Uhre 36'; Martínez (yellow card) 88'	Report	Campbell (yellow card) 31'; Thorkelsson (yellow card) 76'; Miljevic (yellow card) 88'	Stadium: Subaru Park; Attendance: 19,245; Referee: Jon Freemon

June 10 17	CF Montréal	4–0	Minnesota United	Montreal, QC
7:30 PM EDT	Toye 7', 57'; Brault-Guillard 13'; Saliba (yellow card) 16'; Lassiter (yellow card) 69'; Camacho 76', (yellow card) 79'; Corbo (yellow card) 90+3'	Report	Taylor (yellow card) 47'; Boxall (yellow card) 59'	Stadium: Saputo Stadium; Attendance: 17,030; Referee: Guido Gonzales Jr.

June 21 18	CF Montréal	1–0	Nashville SC	Montreal, QC
7:30 PM EDT	Corbo (yellow card) 13'; Wanyama (yellow card) 20'; Duke 27'	Report		Stadium: Saputo Stadium; Attendance: 16,247; Referee: Tori Penso

June 24 19	Charlotte FC	0–0	CF Montréal	Charlotte, NC
7:30 PM EDT	Świderski (yellow card) 30'; Vargas (yellow card) 50'; Copetti (yellow card) 58'	Report		Stadium: Bank of America Stadium; Attendance: 18,032; Referee: Mark Allatin

July 1 20	CF Montréal	0–1	New York City FC	Montreal, QC
7:30 PM EDT	Lassiter (yellow card) 30'	Report	Pellegrini (yellow card) 29', (goal) 33'; Ilenic (yellow card) 64'; Rodríguez (yellow card) 85'	Stadium: Saputo Stadium; Attendance: 16,038; Referee: Victor Rivas

July 8 21	CF Montréal	0–1	Atlanta United FC	Montreal, QC
7:30 PM EDT	Camacho (yellow card) 53'; Kwizera (yellow card) 84'; Campbell (yellow card) 88'	Report	Lennon 54'; Almada (yellow card) 78'; Guzan (yellow card) 90+10'	Stadium: Saputo Stadium; Attendance: 19,619; Referee: Ismir Pekmic

July 12 22	Chicago Fire FC	3–0	CF Montréal	Chicago, IL
8:30 PM EDT	Gutiérrez 9'; Haile-Selassie 11'; Shaqiri 33'; Czichos (yellow card) 35'; Souquet (yellow card) 56'; Pineda (yellow card) 78'	Report	Offor (yellow card) 70'	Stadium: Soldier Field; Attendance: 12,496; Referee: Malik Badawi

July 15 23	CF Montréal	2–0	Charlotte FC	Montreal, QC
7:30 PM EDT	Opoku 29'; Offor 31'	Report	Agyemang (yellow card) 54'; Tuiloma (yellow card) 60'; Sobociński (yellow card) 85'	Stadium: Saputo Stadium; Attendance: 18,413; Referee: Pierre-Luc Lauziere

August 20 24	Toronto FC	2–3	CF Montréal	Toronto, ON
7:30 PM EDT	Servania (yellow card) 45+5'; Bernardeschi 66', 90+4'; Petretta (red card) 77'	Report	Choinière 18', 79' (pen.); Mabika 25' (o.g.); Campbell (yellow card) 90+3'	Stadium: BMO Field; Attendance: 27,518; Referee: Joseph Dickerson

August 26 25	CF Montréal	1–0	New England Revolution	Montreal, QC
7:30 PM EDT	Campbell 86'	Report	Polster (yellow card) 25'	Stadium: Saputo Stadium; Attendance: 19,619; Referee: Ted Unkel

August 30 26	New York City FC	2–0	CF Montréal	New York, NY
7:30 PM EDT	Jasson 30'; Bakrar 37'; Perea (yellow card) 58'	Report	Waterman (yellow card) 45'	Stadium: Yankee Stadium; Attendance: 15,273; Referee: Fotis Bazakos

September 2 27	CF Montréal	2–4	Columbus Crew	Montreal, QC
7:30 PM EDT	Jabang (yellow card) 18'; Opoku 52'; Vilsaint 68'; Miljevic (yellow card) 90+5'	Report	Corbo 14' (o.g.); Hernández 22', 43', 65' (pen.); Yeboah (yellow card) 29'; Amundsen (yellow card) 46'; Schulte (yellow card) 86'	Stadium: Saputo Stadium; Attendance: 18,358; Referee: Filip Dujic

September 16 28	CF Montréal	0–0	Chicago Fire FC	Montreal, QC
7:30 PM EDT	Choinière (yellow card) 13'; Quioto (yellow card) 86'; Corbo (yellow card) 90+3'	Report	Pineda (yellow card) 20'; Doumbia (yellow card) 76'; Herbers (yellow card) 80'	Stadium: Saputo Stadium; Attendance: 19,619; Referee: Mark Allatin

September 20 29	CF Montréal	1–1	FC Cincinnati	Montreal, QC
7:30 PM EDT	Wanyama (yellow card) 34'; Opoku 53'; Offor (yellow card) 90+2'; Sirois (yellow card) 90+5'	Report	Miazga (yellow card) 90'; Arias (yellow card) 90+2'; Acosta 90+7'	Stadium: Saputo Stadium; Attendance: 13,603; Referee: Jon Freemon

September 23 30	Atlanta United FC	4–1	CF Montréal	Atlanta, GA
7:30 PM EDT	Silva 30'; Almada 33'; Giakoumakis 46'; Robinson (yellow card) 65'; Mosquera 89', (yellow card) 90+1'	Report	Hamdi 40'; Waterman (yellow card) 66' (yellow-red card) 87'; Choinière (yellow card) 79'	Stadium: Mercedes-Benz Stadium; Attendance: 42,569; Referee: Rubiel Vazquez

September 30 31	Orlando City SC	3–0	CF Montréal	Orlando, FL
7:30 PM EDT	Sirois 19' (o.g.); Thórhallsson 50'; Torres 54'; Enrique (yellow card) 68'; Araújo (yellow card) 75'	Report	Campbell (yellow card) 24'; Corbo (yellow card) 60'; Saliba (yellow card) 69'	Stadium: Exploria Stadium; Attendance: 19,637; Referee: Sergii Boiko

October 4 32	CF Montréal	1–1	Houston Dynamo FC	Montreal, QC
7:30 PM EDT	Piette (yellow card) 33'; Lappalainen 90+6'	Report	Artur 10'; Ibrahim (yellow card) 18'; Bartlow (yellow card) 56'; Carrasquilla (yellow card) 62'; Quiñónes (yellow card) 84'; Escobar (yellow card) 90+3'; Baird (yellow card) 90+3'	Stadium: Saputo Stadium; Attendance: 13,509; Referee: Ramy Touchan

October 7 33	CF Montréal	4–1	Portland Timbers	Montreal, QC
7:30 PM EDT	Ibrahim 28'; Opoku 30'; Choinière 64'; Toye 76'	Report	Acosta (yellow card) 53'; Boli 86'	Stadium: Saputo Stadium; Attendance: 17,559; Referee: Lukasz Szpala

October 21 34	Columbus Crew	2–1	CF Montréal	Columbus, OH
6:00 PM EDT	Hernández 17'; Nagbe 50'	Report	Ibrahim 7'; Piette (yellow card) 33'	Stadium: Lower.com Field; Attendance: 20,526; Referee: Drew Fischer

== Leagues Cup ==
=== Group stage ===
==== East 2 ====
Pos	Team	Pld	W	PW	PL	L	GF	GA	GD	Pts	Qualification	UNM	DCU	MTL
1	(Mexico) Pumas UNAM	2	1	0	1	0	5	2	+3	4	Advance to knockout stage	—	3–0	—
2	(United States) D.C. United	2	1	0	0	1	1	3	−2	3	Advance to knockout stage	—	—	—
3	(Canada) CF Montréal	2	0	1	0	1	2	3	−1	2		2–2	0–1	—

Source: Leagues Cup
Rules for classification: Tiebreakers

July 22 GS	CF Montréal (Canada)	2–2 (4–2 p)	(Mexico) UNAM	Montreal, Quebec
19:30 ET	Duke 23'; Choinière 43', (yellow card) 59'; Saliba (yellow card) 51'; Sirois (yellow card) 76'	Report	Huerta (yellow card) 76'; Fernández 88'; Montejano 90+1'; Ruvalcaba (yellow card) 90+2'	Stadium: Saputo Stadium; Attendance: 19,619; Referee: Keylor Herrera Villalobos
	Penalties
	Camacho (penalty scored); Choinière (penalty scored); Corbo (penalty scored); Lappalainen (penalty scored)		(penalty missed) Aldrete; (penalty scored) Fernández; (penalty scored) Huerta; (penalty missed) Ruvalcaba

July 26 GS	CF Montréal (Canada)	0–1	(United States) D.C. United	Montreal, Quebec
19:30 ET	Waterman (yellow card) 63'; Piette (yellow card) 65'	Report	Williams (yellow card) 38'; Hurtado 70'	Stadium: Saputo Stadium; Attendance: 19,619; Referee: Filip Dujic

== Canadian Championship ==
=== Bracket ===
- Preliminary round
- April 18–20

- Quarter-finals
- May 9–10

- Semi-finals
- May 24

- Final
- June 7

Langford, BC

Pacific FC (p)
1 (5)

Langford, BC

Cavalry FC
1 (3)

Pacific FC
2

Burnaby, BC

TSS FC Rovers
0

TSS FC Rovers
3

Langford, BC

Valour FC
1

Pacific FC
0

Toronto (York Lions), ON

Vancouver Whitecaps FC
3

York United FC
1

Toronto (York Lions), ON

Vancouver FC
0

York United FC
1

Vancouver Whitecaps FC
4

Vancouver, BC

Vancouver Whitecaps FC
2

CF Montréal
1

Toronto (BMO), ON

Toronto FC
1

Montreal, QC

CF Montréal
2

CF Montréal
2

Montreal, QC

Vaughan Azzurri
0

CF Montréal
2

Hamilton, ON

Forge FC
0

Forge FC
3

Hamilton, ON

FC Laval
0

Forge FC (p)
1 (3)

Toronto (York Lions), ON

Atlético Ottawa
1 (2)

HFX Wanderers FC
1

Atlético Ottawa
3

=== Canadian Championship results ===
April 18 First round	CF Montréal	2–0	Vaughan Azzurri	Montreal, Quebec
7:00 pm ET	Rea 31'; Ibrahim 36'	Report	Higgins (yellow card) 37'; Di Chiara (yellow card) 76'	Stadium: Saputo Stadium; Attendance: 11,069; Referee: Mathieu Souaré

May 9 Quarter-finals	Toronto FC	1–2	CF Montréal	Toronto, Ontario
19:00 ET	Insigne 44'; Sapong (yellow card) 47'	Report	Offor (yellow card) 26', (goal) 39'; Brault-Guillard 35'; Sirois (yellow card) 89'; Herrera (yellow card) 90+5'	Stadium: BMO Field; Attendance: 17,726; Referee: Yusri Rudolf

May 24 Semi-finals	CF Montréal	2–0	Forge FC	Montreal, Quebec
19:00 ET	Lassiter 54'; Ibrahim 78'	Report		Stadium: Saputo Stadium; Attendance: 10,062; Referee: Pierre-Luc Lauziere

June 7 Final	Vancouver Whitecaps FC	2–1	CF Montréal	Vancouver, British Columbia
22:00 ET	White 57'; Gauld 66' (pen.); Berhalter (yellow card) 83'	Report	Lassiter (yellow card) 3'; Camacho (yellow card) 58'; Ibrahim 83'	Stadium: BC Place; Attendance: 20,072; Referee: Filip Dujic

== Statistics ==
=== Appearances, minutes played, and goals scored ===
No.	Nat.	Player	Total			Major League Soccer			Canadian Championship			Leagues Cup			Ref.
No.	Nat.	Player	App.	Min.	Gls	App.	Min.	Gls	App.	Min.	Gls	App.	Min.	Gls	Ref.
Goalkeepers
1	(United States)	Logan Ketterer	1	90	0	0	0	0	1	90	0	0	0	0	
40	(Canada)	Jonathan Sirois	38	3337	0	33	2887	0	3	270	0	2	180	0	
41	(Canada)	James Pantemis	2	173	0	2	173	0	0	0	0	0	0	0	
Defenders
4	(Colombia)	Fernando Álvarez	4	255	0	4	255	0	0	0	0	0	0	0	
15	(Canada)	Zachary Brault-Guillard	30	1630	2	24	1308	1	4	224	1	2	98	0	
16	(Canada)	Joel Waterman	32	2805	1	28	2375	1	3	270	0	2	180	0	
22	(Guatemala)	Aaron Herrera	23	1592	0	19	1419	0	2	91	0	2	82	0	
24	(United States)	George Campbell	29	1965	1	26	1852	1	3	113	0	0	0	0	
25	(Italy)	Gabriele Corbo	34	2818	0	28	2085	0	4	353	0	2	180	0	
26	(Iceland)	Róbert Thorkelsson	10	312	0	9	222	0	1	90	0	0	0	0	
Midfielders
2	(Kenya)	Victor Wanyama	28	1959	0	25	1788	0	2	157	0	1	14	0	
5	(Greece)	Ilias Iliadis	7	341	0	6	251	0	1	90	0	0	0	0	
6	(Canada)	Samuel Piette	17	1175	0	16	1098	0	0	0	0	1	77	0	
7	(Egypt)	Ahmed Hamdy	16	574	1	13	469	1	2	92	0	1	13	0	
10	(United States)	Bryce Duke	31	1774	3	26	1473	2	3	144	0	2	157	1	
19	(Canada)	Nathan Saliba	33	1952	0	28	1767	0	3	65	0	2	120	0	
23	(United States)	Ousman Jabang	3	75	0	3	75	0	0	0	0	0	0	0	
27	(Canada)	Sean Rea	18	908	1	15	734	0	3	174	1	0	0	0	
29	(Canada)	Mathieu Choinière	34	2931	6	28	2436	5	4	315	0	2	180	1	
Forwards
9	(Nigeria)	Chinonso Offor	36	1888	5	29	1515	4	4	238	1	2	127	0	
11	(Costa Rica)	Ariel Lassiter	31	1956	2	27	1600	1	4	251	1	2	105	0	
13	(United States)	Mason Toye	16	714	3	14	680	3	1	12	0	1	22	0	
14	(Nigeria)	Sunusi Ibrahim	29	1447	6	25	1174	3	3	264	3	1	9	0	
17	(Democratic Republic of the Congo)	Jojea Kwizera	4	133	0	4	133	0	0	0	0	0	0	0	
21	(Finland)	Lassi Lappalainen	25	1181	2	21	1034	2	2	89	0	2	58	0	
28	(Canada)	Jules-Anthony Vilsaint	13	445	1	11	408	1	1	6	0	1	31	0	
30	(Honduras)	Romell Quioto	14	871	3	13	796	3	1	75	0	0	0	0	
90	(Ghana)	Kwadwo Opoku	13	1104	4	12	937	4	0	0	0	2	167	0	
No Longer with the Club
3	(Canada)	Kamal Miller	6	477	0	6	477	0	0	0	0	0	0	0	
4	(France)	Rudy Camacho	26	2130	1	20	1613	1	4	337	0	2	180	0	
8	(United States)	Matko Miljevic	7	184	0	10	124	0	2	60	0	0	0	0	
18	(Canada)	Rida Zouhir	6	308	0	5	218	0	1	90	0	0	0	0	
Last updated: October 23, 2023

=== Top scorers ===
Rank	Nat.	Player	Pos.	MLS	Canadian Championship	Leagues Cup	TOTAL
1	(Canada)	Mathieu Choinière	MF	5		1	6
1	(Nigeria)	Sunusi Ibrahim	FW	3	3		6
3	(Nigeria)	Chinonso Offor	FW	4	1		5
4	(Ghana)	Kwadwo Opoku	FW	4			4
5	(Honduras)	Romell Quioto	FW	3			3
5	(United States)	Bryce Duke	MF	2		1	3
5	(United States)	Mason Toye	FW	3			3
8	(Costa Rica)	Ariel Lassiter	MF	1	1		2
8	(Canada)	Zachary Brault-Guillard	DF	1	1		2
8	(Finland)	Lassi Lappalainen	FW	2			2
11	(Canada)	Jules-Anthony Vilsaint	FW	1			1
11	(Canada)	Sean Rea	MF		1		1
11	(Canada)	Joel Waterman	DF	1			1
11	(United States)	George Campbell	DF	1			1
11	(Egypt)	Ahmed Hamdi	MF	1			1
11	(France)	Rudy Camacho	DF	1			1
Totals				33	7	2	42

Updated to match played October 23, 2023
Italic: denotes player left the club during the season.

=== Top assists ===
Rank	Nat.	Player	Pos.	MLS	Canadian Championship	Leagues Cup	TOTAL
1	(Canada)	Mathieu Choinière	MF	5	2		7
2	(Costa Rica)	Ariel Lassiter	FW	2	1	1	4
2	(Nigeria)	Sunusi Ibrahim	FW	3	1		4
4	(United States)	George Campbell	MF	2	1		3
4	(Italy)	Gabriele Corbo	DF	2	1		3
4	(Finland)	Lassi Lappalainen	FW	3			3
4	(Canada)	Joel Waterman	DF	3			3
8	(Canada)	Sean Rea	MF	2			2
8	(Guatemala)	Aaron Herrera	DF	2			2
8	(United States)	Bryce Duke	MF	2			2
11	(Kenya)	Victor Wanyama	MF	1			1
11	(United States)	Mason Toye	FW	1			1
11	(Canada)	Rida Zouhir	MF		1		1
11	(Canada)	Jules-Anthony Vilsaint	FW		1		1
11	(Canada)	Zachary Brault-Guillard	DF		1		1
11	(Canada)	Nathan Saliba	MF		1		1
11	(Ghana)	Kwadwo Opoku	FW	1			1
11	(Honduras)	Romell Quioto	FW	1			1
11	(United States)	Matko Miljevic	MF		1		1
Totals				34	7	1	42

Updated to match played October 23, 2023
Italic: denotes player left the club during the season.

=== Goals against average ===
No.	Nat.	Player	Total			Major League Soccer			Canadian Championship			Leagues Cup		
No.	Nat.	Player	MIN	GA	GAA	MIN	GA	GAA	MIN	GA	GAA	MIN	GA	GAA
1	USA	Logan Ketterer	90	0	0.00	0	0	0.00	90	0	0.00	0	0	0.00
40	CAN	Jonathan Sirois	3337	53	1.43	2887	47	1.47	270	3	1.00	180	3	1.50
41	CAN	James Pantemis	173	5	2.60	173	5	2.60	0	0	0.00	0	0	0.00

Updated to match played October 23, 2023
Source: CF Montréal
Italic: denotes player left the club during the season.

=== Clean sheets ===
No.	Nat.	Player	MLS	Canadian Championship	Leagues Cup	TOTAL
1	(United States)	Logan Ketterer		1		1
40	(Canada)	Jonathan Sirois	11	1		12
41	(Canada)	James Pantemis				0
Totals			11	2	0	13

Updated to match played September 20, 2023
Source: MLSsoccer.com
Italic: denotes player left the club during the season.

=== Top minutes played ===
No.	Nat.	Player	Pos.	MLS	Canadian Championship	Leagues Cup	TOTAL
40	(Canada)	Jonathan Sirois	GK	2887	270	180	3337
29	(Canada)	Mathieu Choinière	MF	2436	315	180	2931
25	(Italy)	Gabriele Corbo	DF	2085	353	180	2818
16	(Canada)	Joel Waterman	DF	2375	270	180	2805
4	(France)	Rudy Camacho	DF	1613	337	180	2130
24	(United States)	George Campbell	DF	1852	113		1965
2	(Kenya)	Victor Wanyama	MF	1788	157	14	1959
11	(Costa Rica)	Ariel Lassiter	FW	1600	251	105	1956
10	(Canada)	Nathan Saliba	MF	1767	65	120	1952
9	(Nigeria)	Chinonso Offor	FW	1515	238	127	1888

Updated to match played October 23, 2023
Source: Montreal Impact
Italic: denotes player left the club during the season.

=== Yellow and red cards ===
No.	Player	Total			Major League Soccer			Canadian Championship			Leagues Cup			Ref.
No.	Player	Yellow card	(yellow card) (red card)	Red card	Yellow card	(yellow card) (red card)	Red card	Yellow card	(yellow card) (red card)	Red card	Yellow card	(yellow card) (red card)	Red card	Ref.
1	Logan Ketterer	0	0	0	0	0	0	0	0	0	0	0	0	
2	Victor Wanyama	6	0	0	6	0	0	0	0	0	0	0	0	
4	Fernando Álvarez	0	0	0	0	0	0	0	0	0	0	0	0	
5	Ilias Iliadis	2	1	0	2	1	0	0	0	0	0	0	0	
6	Samuel Piette	4	0	0	3	0	0	0	0	0	1	0	0	
7	Ahmed Hamdy	1	0	0	1	0	0	0	0	0	0	0	0	
9	Chinonso Offor	4	0	0	3	0	0	1	0	0	0	0	0	
10	Bryce Duke	2	0	0	2	0	0	0	0	0	0	0	0	
11	Ariel Lassiter	4	0	0	3	0	0	1	0	0	0	0	0	
13	Mason Toye	0	0	0	0	0	0	0	0	0	0	0	0	
14	Sunusi Ibrahim	0	0	0	0	0	0	0	0	0	0	0	0	
15	Zachary Brault-Guillard	0	0	0	0	0	0	0	0	0	0	0	0	
16	Joel Waterman	9	0	1	8	0	1	0	0	0	1	0	0	
17	Jojea Kwizera	1	0	0	1	0	0	0	0	0	0	0	0	
18	Rida Zouhir	1	0	0	1	0	0	0	0	0	0	0	0	
19	Nathan Saliba	4	0	0	3	0	0	0	0	0	1	0	0	
21	Lassi Lappalainen	0	0	0	0	0	0	0	0	0	0	0	0	
22	Aaron Herrera	4	0	0	3	0	0	1	0	0	0	0	0	
23	Ousman Jabang	1	0	0	1	0	0	0	0	0	0	0	0	
24	George Campbell	5	0	0	5	0	0	0	0	0	0	0	0	
25	Gabriele Corbo	6	0	0	6	0	0	0	0	0	0	0	0	
26	Róbert Thorkelsson	2	0	0	2	0	0	0	0	0	0	0	0	
27	Sean Rea	2	0	0	2	0	0	0	0	0	0	0	0	
28	Jules-Anthony Vilsaint	0	0	0	0	0	0	0	0	0	0	0	0	
29	Mathieu Choinière	5	0	0	4	0	0	0	0	0	1	0	0	
30	Romell Quioto	2	0	0	2	0	0	0	0	0	0	0	0	
40	Jonathan Sirois	3	0	0	1	0	0	1	0	0	1	0	0	
41	James Pantemis	0	0	0	0	0	0	0	0	0	0	0	0	
90	Kwadwo Opoku	0	0	0	0	0	0	0	0	0	0	0	0	
	Kamal Miller	1	0	0	1	0	0	0	0	0	0	0	0	
	Rudy Camacho	6	0	1	5	0	1	1	0	0	0	0	0	
	Matko Miljevic	2	0	0	2	0	0	0	0	0	0	0	0	
Totals		77	1	2	67	1	2	5	0	0	5	0	0	
Last updated: October 23, 2023

== Recognition ==
=== MLS team of the Week ===
Week	Player	Nation	Position	Report
4	Quioto	Honduras	FW	MLS team of the Week: 4
9	Choinière	Canada	MF	MLS team of the Week: 9
10	Choinière	Canada	MF	MLS team of the Week: 10
11	Herrera	United States	DF	MLS team of the Week: 11
11	Camacho	France	BN	MLS team of the Week: 11
12	Campbell	United States	DF	MLS team of the Week: 12
12	Losada	Argentina	Coach	MLS team of the Week: 12
15	Sirois	Canada	GK	MLS team of the Week: 15
16	Ibrahim	Nigeria	FW	MLS team of the Week: 16
16	Lassiter	Costa Rica	BN	MLS team of the Week: 16
18	Toye	United States	FW	MLS team of the Week: 18
18	Camacho	France	BN	MLS team of the Week: 18
20	Duke	United States	BN	MLS team of the Week: 20
26	Waterman	Canada	DF	MLS team of the Week: 26
27	Choinière	Canada	MF	MLS team of the Week: 27
28	Campbell	United States	DF	MLS team of the Week: 28
36	Lappalainen	Finland	BN	MLS team of the Week: 36
37	Choinière	Canada	MF	MLS team of the Week: 37
37	Opoku	Ghana	BN	MLS team of the Week: 37
