= 2023 Leagues Cup group stage =

Soccer tournament in North America

The 2023 Leagues Cup group stage was played from July 21 to 31, 2023. A total of 45 teams competed in the group stage to decide the 30 of the 32 places in the knockout stage of the 2023 Leagues Cup.

== Format ==
In each of the 15 groups, teams played against each other in a round-robin format. The top two teams of each group advanced to the round of 32.

Besides the teams receiving byes, the top 15 remaining teams from each league were placed into groups in reverse order (for example, the 2nd-ranked MLS club was drawn against the 16th-ranked Liga MX club). The remaining teams (13 MLS and 2 Liga MX) were drawn into groups and divided into geographical regions.

Teams were ranked according to points (3 points for a win in regulation, 2 points for a win in a penalty shoot-out, 1 point for a loss in a penalty shoot-out, 0 points for a loss in regulation). If, at the end of the group stage, two or more clubs were tied in points, their positions in the table were determined according to a set of tie-breaking criteria.

1. In case only two teams were tied on points, the direct head-to-head match result between the tied clubs determined the ranking (for clarity, a victory on penalties was considered a win for purposes of this tiebreaker);
2. In case three teams were tied on points, the following criteria would apply (if, after applying a criterion, only two teams remained tied, their head-to-head match result would determine their ranking): (Note: When there were two or more teams tied in points, criteria 1–6 were applied. After these criteria were applied, they may have defined the position of some of the teams involved, but not all of them. For example, if there was a three-way tie on points, the application of the first three criteria may only have broken the tie for one of the teams, leaving the other two teams to still be tied. In this case, the result between the remaining two teams would break the tie.)
  1. Direct head-to-head match result between the tied clubs (for clarity, a victory on penalties was considered a win for purposes of this tiebreaker);
  2. Better overall goal differential between goals scored and goals conceded during the group stage;
  3. Greater number of goals scored during the group stage;
  4. Fewer number of goals conceded during the group stage;
  5. Clubs' fair-play table
    - First yellow card: –1 point
    - Second yellow card (indirect red card): –3 points (The first yellow card would not be considered)
    - Direct red card: –3 points
    - Yellow card followed by a direct red card: –4 points;
  6. A draw organized by the organizing committee.

== Groups ==
The matches were played on July 21–23, July 25–27, and July 29–31, 2023.

Times are EDT, as listed by CONCACAF (local times, if different, are in parentheses).

=== West 1 ===
Pos	Team	Pld	W	PW	PL	L	GF	GA	GD	Pts	Qualification	UAN	POR	SJE
1	(Mexico) Tigres UANL	2	2	0	0	0	3	1	+2	6	Advance to knockout stage	—	2–1	1–0
2	(United States) Portland Timbers	2	1	0	0	1	3	2	+1	3	Advance to knockout stage	—	—	2–0
3	(United States) San Jose Earthquakes	2	0	0	0	2	0	3	−3	0		—	—	—

Source: Leagues Cup
Rules for classification: Tiebreakers
July 22, 2023
22:00 (19:00 UTC-7)

Portland Timbers (United States)	2–0	(United States) San Jose Earthquakes
Evander 33'; Mora 86'	Report

Providence Park, Portland, Oregon
Attendance: 21,137
Referee: Víctor Cáceres (Mexico)

July 26, 2023
22:00 (19:00 UTC-7)

Tigres UANL (Mexico)	2–1	(United States) Portland Timbers
Gignac 42'; Angulo 80'	Report	Evander 24'

Providence Park, Portland, Oregon
Attendance: 21,755
Referee: Walter López (Guatemala)

July 30, 2023
23:00 (20:00 UTC-7)

Tigres UANL (Mexico)	1–0	(United States) San Jose Earthquakes
Gorriarán 19'	Report

PayPal Park, San Jose, California
Attendance: 17,449
Referee: Marcos de Oliveira (United States)

=== West 2 ===
Pos	Team	Pld	W	PW	PL	L	GF	GA	GD	Pts	Qualification	MON	RSL	SEA
1	(Mexico) Monterrey	2	2	0	0	0	7	2	+5	6	Advance to knockout stage	—	3–0	4–2
2	(United States) Real Salt Lake	2	1	0	0	1	3	3	0	3	Advance to knockout stage	—	—	3–0
3	(United States) Seattle Sounders FC	2	0	0	0	2	2	7	−5	0		—	—	—

Source: Leagues Cup
Rules for classification: Tiebreakers
July 22, 2023
21:30 (19:30 UTC-6)

Real Salt Lake (United States)	3–0	(United States) Seattle Sounders FC
Savarino 48'; Arango 51'; Rubin 88'	Report

America First Field, Sandy, Utah
Attendance: 10,507
Referee: Guillermo Pacheco (Mexico)

July 26, 2023
21:30 (19:30 UTC-6)

Monterrey (Mexico)	3–0	(United States) Real Salt Lake
Glad 8' (o.g.); Berterame 13', 74'	Report

America First Field, Sandy, Utah
Attendance: 20,734
Referee: Rosendo Mendoza (United States)

July 30, 2023
21:00 (18:00 UTC-7)

Monterrey (Mexico)	4–2	(United States) Seattle Sounders FC
Berterame 31', 45+2' (pen.), 63'; Cortizo 48'	Report	Lodeiro 2'; Morris 6'

Lumen Field, Seattle, Washington
Attendance: 33,508
Referee: Bryan López (Guatemala)

=== West 3 ===
Pos	Team	Pld	W	PW	PL	L	GF	GA	GD	Pts	Qualification	LEO	VAN	LAX
1	(Mexico) León	2	1	1	0	0	3	2	+1	5	Advance to knockout stage	—	—	—
2	(Canada) Vancouver Whitecaps FC	2	1	0	1	0	4	3	+1	4	Advance to knockout stage	2–2	—	—
3	(United States) LA Galaxy	2	0	0	0	2	1	3	−2	0		0–1	1–2	—

Source: Leagues Cup
Rules for classification: Tiebreakers
July 21, 2023
22:30 (19:30 UTC-7)

León (Mexico)	2–2	(Canada) Vancouver Whitecaps FC
Moreno 23'; Hernández 77'	Report	Córdova 44', 57'
Penalties
Frías (penalty scored); Ramírez (penalty scored); Hernández (penalty missed); Sánchez (penalty missed); Rubio (penalty scored); O. Rodríguez (penalty scored); Tesillo (penalty scored); Ambríz (penalty missed); Romero (penalty scored); Barreiro (penalty scored); Cota (penalty scored); Frías (penalty scored); Hernández (penalty scored); Romero (penalty scored); Tesillo (penalty scored); Rubio (penalty scored); Ramírez (penalty scored); O. Rodríguez (penalty scored); Sánchez (penalty scored)	16–15	(penalty scored) Gauld; (penalty scored) Caicedo; (penalty missed) Cubas; (penalty missed) Martins; (penalty scored) White; (penalty scored) Blackmon; (penalty scored) Veselinović; (penalty missed) Laborda; (penalty scored) Becher; (penalty scored) Teibert; (penalty scored) Takaoka; (penalty scored) Gauld; (penalty scored) Caicedo; (penalty scored) White; (penalty scored) Veselinović; (penalty scored) Blackmon; (penalty scored) Becher; (penalty scored) Cubas; (penalty missed) Martins

BC Place, Vancouver, British Columbia
Attendance: 17,391
Referee: Fernando Guerrero (Mexico)

July 26, 2023 (Note: The match between the LA Galaxy and León was originally scheduled for July 25 but was delayed by a day due to a mechanical problem with León's charter plane. As a result the match between the LA Galaxy and Vancouver Whitecaps FC on July 29 was also rescheduled to July 30.)
22:30 (19:30 UTC-7)

LA Galaxy (United States)	0–1	(Mexico) León
	Report	Mena 58'

Dignity Health Sports Park, Carson, California
Attendance: 20,776
Referee: Juan Gabriel Calderón (Costa Rica)

July 30, 2023
21:00 (18:00 UTC-7)

LA Galaxy (United States)	1–2	(Canada) Vancouver Whitecaps FC
Puig 16'	Report	Calegari 81' (o.g.); White 90+1'

Dignity Health Sports Park, Carson, California
Attendance: 14,787
Referee: Walter López (Guatemala)

=== Central 1 ===
Pos	Team	Pld	W	PW	PL	L	GF	GA	GD	Pts	Qualification	CLB	CAM	STL
1	(United States) Columbus Crew	2	2	0	0	0	6	2	+4	6	Advance to knockout stage	—	—	2–1
2	(Mexico) América	2	1	0	0	1	5	4	+1	3	Advance to knockout stage	1–4	—	4–0
3	(United States) St. Louis City SC	2	0	0	0	2	1	6	−5	0		—	—	—

Source: Leagues Cup
Rules for classification: Tiebreakers
July 23, 2023
19:30

Columbus Crew (United States)	2–1	(United States) St. Louis City SC
Zelarayán 11'; Hernández 29' (pen.)	Report	Russell-Rowe 85' (o.g.)

Lower.com Field, Columbus, Ohio
Attendance: 20,533
Referee: Reon Radix (Grenada)

July 27, 2023
22:00 (21:00 UTC-5)

América (Mexico)	4–0	(United States) St. Louis City SC
Martín 5'; Quiñones 51'; Álvarez 54'; Zendejas 77'	Report

CityPark, St. Louis, Missouri
Attendance: 22,430
Referee: Selvin Brown (Honduras)

July 31, 2023
20:00

América (Mexico)	1–4	(United States) Columbus Crew
Álvarez 29'	Report	Hernández 41', 69' (pen.); Ramirez 81'; Moreira 90+3'

Lower.com Field, Columbus, Ohio
Attendance: 20,217
Referee: Fernando Guerrero (Mexico)

=== Central 2 ===
Pos	Team	Pld	W	PW	PL	L	GF	GA	GD	Pts	Qualification	CHI	MIN	PUE
1	(United States) Chicago Fire FC	2	1	0	1	0	4	3	+1	4	Advance to knockout stage	—	—	—
2	(United States) Minnesota United FC	2	1	0	0	1	6	3	+3	3	Advance to knockout stage	2–3	—	—
3	(Mexico) Puebla	2	0	1	0	1	1	5	−4	2		1–1	0–4	—

Source: Leagues Cup
Rules for classification: Tiebreakers
July 23, 2023
21:00 (20:00 UTC-5)

Puebla (Mexico)	0–4	(United States) Minnesota United FC
	Report	Hlongwane 24', 51'; Reynoso 59', 65'

Allianz Field, Saint Paul, Minnesota
Attendance: 19,609
Referee: Selvin Brown (Honduras)

July 27, 2023
20:30 (19:30 UTC-5)

Minnesota United FC (United States)	2–3	(United States) Chicago Fire FC
Hlongwane 62', 73'	Report	Shaqiri 69' (pen.); Souquet 79'; Kamara 83'

Allianz Field, Saint Paul, Minnesota
Attendance: 18,419
Referee: Nima Saghafi (United States)

July 31, 2023
20:30 (19:30 UTC-5)

Puebla (Mexico)	1–1	(United States) Chicago Fire FC
Angulo 74'	Report	Shaqiri 79'
Penalties
Mancuello (penalty scored); Álvarez (penalty missed); Barragán (penalty scored); Ferrareis (penalty scored); Angulo (penalty scored); Silva (penalty scored); Velasco (penalty scored); Olmedo (penalty scored); González (penalty scored); Rodríguez (penalty scored); Mancuello (penalty scored)	10–9	(penalty missed) Czichos; (penalty scored) Shaqiri; (penalty scored) Gutiérrez; (penalty scored) Przybyłko; (penalty scored) Pineda; (penalty scored) Aceves; (penalty scored) Torres; (penalty scored) Doumbia; (penalty scored) Terán; (penalty scored) Brady; (penalty missed) Czichos

SeatGeek Stadium, Bridgeview, Illinois
Attendance: 12,619
Referee: Jesús López Valle (Mexico)

=== Central 3 ===
Pos	Team	Pld	W	PW	PL	L	GF	GA	GD	Pts	Qualification	CIN	SKC	GUA
1	(United States) FC Cincinnati	2	1	1	0	0	6	4	+2	5	Advance to knockout stage	—	3–3	—
2	(United States) Sporting Kansas City	2	1	0	1	0	4	3	+1	4	Advance to knockout stage	—	—	—
3	(Mexico) Guadalajara	2	0	0	0	2	1	4	−3	0		1–3	0–1	—

Source: Leagues Cup
Rules for classification: Tiebreakers
July 23, 2023
19:30

FC Cincinnati (United States)	3–3	(United States) Sporting Kansas City
Pulskamp 34' (o.g.); Vázquez 56'; Acosta 90+8' (pen.)	Report	Hagglund 9' (o.g.); Rosero 12'; Kinda 69' (pen.)
Penalties
Acosta (penalty scored); Vázquez (penalty scored); Kubo (penalty scored); Miazga (penalty scored)	4–2	(penalty scored) Thommy; (penalty scored) Shelton; (penalty missed) Walter; (penalty missed) Fontàs

TQL Stadium, Cincinnati, Ohio
Attendance: 24,524
Referee: Daniel Quintero (Mexico)

July 27, 2023 (Note: The match between FC Cincinnati and Guadalajara was suspended in the 60th minute due to inclement weather and resumed on July 28 at 14:00 EDT, with Cincinnati leading 2–0.)
20:00

Guadalajara (Mexico)	1–3	(United States) FC Cincinnati
Briseño 61'	Report	Vázquez 2', 8', 73'

TQL Stadium, Cincinnati, Ohio
Attendance: 25,143
Referee: Benjamín Pineda (Costa Rica)

July 31, 2023
22:00 (21:00 UTC-5)

Guadalajara (Mexico)	0–1	(United States) Sporting Kansas City
	Report	Russell 27'

Children's Mercy Park, Kansas City, Kansas
Attendance: 20,373
Referee: Lukasz Szpala (United States)

=== Central 4 ===
Pos	Team	Pld	W	PW	PL	L	GF	GA	GD	Pts	Qualification	TOL	NAS	COL
1	(Mexico) Toluca	2	2	0	0	0	8	4	+4	6	Advance to knockout stage	—	—	4–1
2	(United States) Nashville SC	2	1	0	0	1	5	5	0	3	Advance to knockout stage	3–4	—	2–1
3	(United States) Colorado Rapids	2	0	0	0	2	2	6	−4	0		—	—	—

Source: Leagues Cup
Rules for classification: Tiebreakers
July 23, 2023
20:30 (19:30 UTC-5)

Nashville SC (United States)	2–1	(United States) Colorado Rapids
Mukhtar 57'; Shaffelburg 65'	Report	Gutman 80'

Geodis Park, Nashville, Tennessee
Attendance: 16,087
Referee: David Gómez (Costa Rica)

July 27, 2023
20:30 (19:30 UTC-5)

Nashville SC (United States)	3–4	(Mexico) Toluca
Zimmerman 3'; Picault 37'; Haakenson 70'	Report	Ruiz 27', 44'; Volpi 45+8' (pen.); Morales 61'

Geodis Park, Nashville, Tennessee
Attendance: 19,817
Referee: Ricardo Montero (Costa Rica)

July 31, 2023
21:30 (19:30 UTC-6)

Toluca (Mexico)	4–1	(United States) Colorado Rapids
Pedro Raul 45'; López 76'; Angulo 90+3'; Huerta 90+7' (pen.)	Report	Rubio 90+1' (pen.)

Dick's Sporting Goods Park, Commerce City, Colorado
Attendance: 15,388
Referee: Selvin Brown (Honduras)

=== South 1 ===
Pos	Team	Pld	W	PW	PL	L	GF	GA	GD	Pts	Qualification	MAZ	JUA	AUS
1	(Mexico) Mazatlán	2	1	1	0	0	4	2	+2	5	Advance to knockout stage	—	1–1	—
2	(Mexico) Juárez	2	1	0	1	0	4	2	+2	4	Advance to knockout stage	—	—	—
3	(United States) Austin FC	2	0	0	0	2	2	6	−4	0		1–3	1–3	—

Source: Leagues Cup
Rules for classification: Tiebreakers
July 21, 2023
20:30 (19:30 UTC-5)

Austin FC (United States)	1–3	(Mexico) Mazatlán
Fagúndez 65' (pen.)	Report	Colmán 49'; Montaño 67'; Bello 88'

Q2 Stadium, Austin, Texas
Attendance: 20,738
Referee: Randy Encarnación (Dominican Republic)

July 25, 2023
20:30 (19:30 UTC-5)

Mazatlán (Mexico)	1–1	(Mexico) Juárez
Loba 49'	Report	Intriago 25' (o.g.)
Penalties
Montaño (penalty scored); Amarilla (penalty scored); Almada (penalty scored); Intriago (penalty scored)	4–2	(penalty scored) Ortega; (penalty missed) Urzi; (penalty scored) Osuna; (penalty missed) Nevárez

Q2 Stadium, Austin, Texas
Attendance: 958
Referee: Víctor Cáceres (Mexico)

July 29, 2023
20:30 (19:30 UTC-5)

Austin FC (United States)	1–3	(Mexico) Juárez
Finlay 23'	Report	Saucedo 35'; A. García 62', 69'

Q2 Stadium, Austin, Texas
Attendance: 20,738
Referee: Ismael López (Mexico)

=== South 2 ===
Pos	Team	Pld	W	PW	PL	L	GF	GA	GD	Pts	Qualification	ORL	HOU	SAN
1	(United States) Orlando City SC	2	1	1	0	0	4	3	+1	5	Advance to knockout stage	—	1–1	—
2	(United States) Houston Dynamo FC	2	0	1	1	0	3	3	0	3	Advance to knockout stage	—	—	—
3	(Mexico) Santos Laguna	2	0	0	1	1	4	5	−1	1		2–3	2–2	—

Source: Leagues Cup
Rules for classification: Tiebreakers
July 21, 2023
20:00

Orlando City SC (United States)	1–1	(United States) Houston Dynamo FC
McGuire 46'	Report	Bassi 45+5' (pen.)
Penalties
Kara (penalty scored); Santos (penalty scored); Jansson (penalty scored); Carlos (penalty scored); Torres (penalty scored)	5–4	(penalty missed) Herrera; (penalty scored) Úlfarsson; (penalty scored) Carrasquilla; (penalty scored) Dorsey; (penalty scored) Smith

Exploria Stadium, Orlando, Florida
Attendance: 14,005
Referee: Filip Dujic (Canada)

July 25, 2023
20:00 (19:00 UTC-5)

Santos Laguna (Mexico)	2–2	(United States) Houston Dynamo FC
Preciado 45', 62' (pen.)	Report	Baird 14'; Dorsey 26'
Penalties
Brunetta (penalty scored); Preciado (penalty scored); Dória (penalty scored); Torres (penalty scored); R. López (penalty missed)	4–5	(penalty scored) Bassi; (penalty scored) Úlfarsson; (penalty scored) Franco; (penalty scored) Smith; (penalty scored) Caicedo

Shell Energy Stadium, Houston, Texas
Attendance: 12,627
Referee: Ismael Cornejo (El Salvador)

July 29, 2023
19:30

Santos Laguna (Mexico)	2–3	(United States) Orlando City SC
R. López 41'; Preciado 58'	Report	McGuire 44'; Pereyra 46'; Cartagena 90+2'

Exploria Stadium, Orlando, Florida
Attendance: 16,313
Referee: Victor Rivas (United States)

=== South 3 ===
Pos	Team	Pld	W	PW	PL	L	GF	GA	GD	Pts	Qualification	MIA	CAZ	ATL
1	(United States) Inter Miami CF	2	2	0	0	0	6	1	+5	6	Advance to knockout stage	—	—	4–0
2	(Mexico) Cruz Azul	2	0	1	0	1	2	3	−1	2	Advance to knockout stage	1–2	—	1–1
3	(United States) Atlanta United FC	2	0	0	1	1	1	5	−4	1		—	—	—

Source: Leagues Cup
Rules for classification: Tiebreakers
July 21, 2023
20:00

Cruz Azul (Mexico)	1–2	(United States) Inter Miami CF
Antuna 65'	Report	Taylor 44'; Messi 90+4'

DRV PNK Stadium, Fort Lauderdale, Florida
Attendance: 20,512
Referee: Saíd Martínez (Honduras)

July 25, 2023
19:30

Inter Miami CF (United States)	4–0	(United States) Atlanta United FC
Messi 8', 22'; Taylor 44', 53'	Report

DRV PNK Stadium, Fort Lauderdale, Florida
Attendance: 19,758
Referee: Mario Escobar (Guatemala)

July 29, 2023
20:00

Cruz Azul (Mexico)	1–1	(United States) Atlanta United FC
Moisés 20'	Report	Almada 75'
Penalties
Salcedo (penalty missed); Rivero (penalty scored); Tabó (penalty scored); Rotondi (penalty scored); Antuna (penalty scored); Lotti (penalty scored)	5–4	(penalty scored) Lennon; (penalty scored) Muyumba; (penalty missed) Berry; (penalty scored) Almada; (penalty scored) Giakoumakis; (penalty missed) Purata

Mercedes-Benz Stadium, Atlanta, Georgia
Attendance: 41,108
Referee: Oliver Vergara (Panama)

=== South 4 ===
Pos	Team	Pld	W	PW	PL	L	GF	GA	GD	Pts	Qualification	CLT	DAL	NEC
1	(United States) Charlotte FC	2	1	1	0	0	6	3	+3	5	Advance to knockout stage	—	—	—
2	(United States) FC Dallas	2	1	0	1	0	5	2	+3	4	Advance to knockout stage	2–2	—	3–0
3	(Mexico) Necaxa	2	0	0	0	2	1	7	−6	0		1–4	—	—

Source: Leagues Cup
Rules for classification: Tiebreakers
July 21, 2023
20:30 (19:30 UTC-5)

FC Dallas (United States)	2–2	(United States) Charlotte FC
Kamungo 45'; Lletget 75'	Report	Świderski 61' (pen.); Bender 90+7'
Penalties
Lletget (penalty missed); Farfan (penalty missed); Ferreira (penalty scored)	1–4	(penalty scored) Świderski; (penalty scored) Bender; (penalty scored) Cambridge; (penalty scored) Agyemang

Toyota Stadium, Frisco, Texas
Attendance: 10,425
Referee: Jorge Camacho (Mexico)

July 25, 2023
20:30 (19:30 UTC-5)

FC Dallas (United States)	3–0	(Mexico) Necaxa
Lletget 24'; Ansah 62'; Ferreira 73'	Report

Toyota Stadium, Frisco, Texas
Attendance: 6,149
Referee: Joe Dickerson (United States)

July 29, 2023
19:30

Necaxa (Mexico)	1–4	(United States) Charlotte FC
Poggi 89'	Report	Bronico 6'; Świderski 42'; Arfield 45+7'; Agyemang 87'

Bank of America Stadium, Charlotte, North Carolina
Attendance: 29,575
Referee: Guido Gonzales Jr. (United States)

=== East 1 ===
Pos	Team	Pld	W	PW	PL	L	GF	GA	GD	Pts	Qualification	PHI	QFC	TIJ
1	(United States) Philadelphia Union	2	2	0	0	0	8	2	+6	6	Advance to knockout stage	—	5–1	3–1
2	(Mexico) Querétaro	2	1	0	0	1	2	5	−3	3	Advance to knockout stage	—	—	—
3	(Mexico) Tijuana	2	0	0	0	2	1	4	−3	0		—	0–1	—

Source: Leagues Cup
Rules for classification: Tiebreakers
July 22, 2023
20:00

Philadelphia Union (United States)	3–1	(Mexico) Tijuana
Gazdag 21' (pen.); Carranza 26', 71'	Report	González 46'

Subaru Park, Chester, Pennsylvania
Attendance: 17,731
Referee: Oshane Nation (Jamaica)

July 26, 2023
19:30

Philadelphia Union (United States)	5–1	(Mexico) Querétaro
Gazdag 30', 39' (pen.), 63' (pen.); Harriel 43'; McGlynn 89'	Report	Sandoval 84'

Subaru Park, Chester, Pennsylvania
Attendance: 17,731
Referee: Daneon Parchment (Jamaica)

July 30, 2023
19:30

Tijuana (Mexico)	0–1	(Mexico) Querétaro
	Report	Gularte 45+1'

Subaru Park, Chester, Pennsylvania
Attendance: 1,000
Referee: Abraham de Jesús Quirarte (Mexico)

=== East 2 ===
Pos	Team	Pld	W	PW	PL	L	GF	GA	GD	Pts	Qualification	UNM	DCU	MTL
1	(Mexico) Pumas UNAM	2	1	0	1	0	5	2	+3	4	Advance to knockout stage	—	3–0	—
2	(United States) D.C. United	2	1	0	0	1	1	3	−2	3	Advance to knockout stage	—	—	—
3	(Canada) CF Montréal	2	0	1	0	1	2	3	−1	2		2–2	0–1	—

Source: Leagues Cup
Rules for classification: Tiebreakers
July 22, 2023
19:30

CF Montréal (Canada)	2–2	(Mexico) Pumas UNAM
Duke 23'; Choinière 43'	Report	Fernández 88'; Montejano 90+1'
Penalties
Camacho (penalty scored); Choinière (penalty scored); Corbo (penalty scored); Lappalainen (penalty scored)	4–2	(penalty missed) Aldrete; (penalty scored) Fernández; (penalty scored) Huerta; (penalty missed) Ruvalcaba

Saputo Stadium, Montreal, Quebec
Attendance: 19,619
Referee: Keylor Herrera (Costa Rica)

July 26, 2023
19:30

CF Montréal (Canada)	0–1	(United States) D.C. United
	Report	Hurtado 70'

Saputo Stadium, Montreal, Quebec
Attendance: 19,619
Referee: Filip Dujic (Canada)

July 29, 2023
19:00

Pumas UNAM (Mexico)	3–0	(United States) D.C. United
Huerta 6'; Nathan 42'; Fernández 52'	Report

Audi Field, Washington, D.C.
Attendance: 14,599
Referee: Oshane Nation (Jamaica)

=== East 3 ===
Pos	Team	Pld	W	PW	PL	L	GF	GA	GD	Pts	Qualification	ATL	NYC	TOR
1	(Mexico) Atlas	2	2	0	0	0	2	0	+2	6	Advance to knockout stage	—	—	1–0
2	(United States) New York City FC	2	1	0	0	1	5	1	+4	3	Advance to knockout stage	0–1	—	5–0
3	(Canada) Toronto FC	2	0	0	0	2	0	6	−6	0		—	—	—

Source: Leagues Cup
Rules for classification: Tiebreakers
July 23, 2023
19:00

New York City FC (United States)	0–1	(Mexico) Atlas
	Report	Rocha 7'

Citi Field, New York City, New York
Attendance: 22,267
Referee: Bryan López (Guatemala)

July 26, 2023
19:30

New York City FC (United States)	5–0	(Canada) Toronto FC
Chanot 30'; Bakrar 45'; Rodríguez 45+2', 75'; Jasson 56'	Report

Red Bull Arena, Harrison, New Jersey
Attendance: 7,417
Referee: Guillermo Pacheco (Mexico)

July 30, 2023
19:30

Atlas (Mexico)	1–0	(Canada) Toronto FC
Caicedo 2'	Report

BMO Field, Toronto, Ontario
Attendance: 24,633
Referee: Nima Saghafi (United States)

=== East 4 ===
Pos	Team	Pld	W	PW	PL	L	GF	GA	GD	Pts	Qualification	NYR	NER	ASL
1	(United States) New York Red Bulls	2	1	1	0	0	2	1	+1	5	Advance to knockout stage	—	0–0	2–1
2	(United States) New England Revolution	2	1	0	1	0	5	1	+4	4	Advance to knockout stage	—	—	—
3	(Mexico) Atlético San Luis	2	0	0	0	2	2	7	−5	0		—	1–5	—

Source: Leagues Cup
Rules for classification: Tiebreakers
July 22, 2023
19:30

New York Red Bulls (United States)	0–0	(United States) New England Revolution
	Report
Penalties
Elias (penalty missed); Edelman (penalty scored); Vanzeir (penalty scored); S. Nealis (penalty scored); Tolkin (penalty scored)	4–2	(penalty scored) C. Gil; (penalty scored) Bou; (penalty missed) Jones; (penalty missed) Vrioni

Red Bull Arena, Harrison, New Jersey
Attendance: 9,139
Referee: Pierre-Luc Lauzière (Canada)

July 26, 2023
19:30

Atlético San Luis (Mexico)	1–5	(United States) New England Revolution
Klimowicz 22'	Report	Vrioni 15', 39', 60'; Bou 29'; Domínguez 32' (o.g.)

Gillette Stadium, Foxborough, Massachusetts
Attendance: 12,327
Referee: Rubiel Vazquez (United States)

July 30, 2023
19:30

New York Red Bulls (United States)	2–1	(Mexico) Atlético San Luis
Vanzeir 56', 90+2'	Report	Murillo 69'

Red Bull Arena, Harrison, New Jersey
Attendance: 10,421
Referee: Iván López Sánchez (Mexico)
