= 2023 Leagues Cup knockout stage =

Second and final stage of soccer tournament

The knockout stage of the 2023 Leagues Cup was the second and final stage of the competition, following the group stage. The knockout stage began on August 2 and concluded with the final on August 19. The top two teams from each group advanced to the knockout stage to compete in a single-elimination tournament. There were 32 matches in the knockout stage, including a third-place play-off played between the two losing teams of the semi-finals.

== Format ==
The knockout stage of the 2023 Leagues Cup was contested between 30 teams that qualified from the group stage and two that received a bye. Matches in the knockout stage were played to a finish. If the score of a match was level at the end of 90 minutes of playing time, no extra time was played, and the match was decided by a penalty shoot-out.

== Qualified teams ==
The top two placed teams from each of the fifteen groups qualified for the knockout stage, joining Los Angeles FC and Pachuca, who received byes to this round.

League path
League	Team	Qualification
Liga MX	(Mexico) Pachuca	Champion with the most points in the accumulated table of the 2022 Clausura and Apertura tournaments
MLS	(United States) Los Angeles FC	MLS Cup 2022 winner

Group stage path
Group	Winners	Runners-up
W1	(Mexico) UANL	(United States) Portland Timbers
W2	(Mexico) Monterrey	(United States) Real Salt Lake
W3	(Mexico) León	(Canada) Vancouver Whitecaps FC
C1	(United States) Columbus Crew	(Mexico) América
C2	(United States) Chicago Fire FC	(United States) Minnesota United FC
C3	(United States) FC Cincinnati	(United States) Sporting Kansas City
C4	(Mexico) Toluca	(United States) Nashville SC
S1	(Mexico) Mazatlán	(Mexico) Juárez
S2	(United States) Orlando City SC	(United States) Houston Dynamo FC
S3	(United States) Inter Miami CF	(Mexico) Cruz Azul
S4	(United States) Charlotte FC	(United States) FC Dallas
E1	(United States) Philadelphia Union	(Mexico) Querétaro
E2	(Mexico) UNAM	(United States) D.C. United
E3	(Mexico) Atlas	(United States) New York City FC
E4	(United States) New York Red Bulls	(United States) New England Revolution

== Bracket ==
The tournament bracket is shown below, with bold denoting the winners of each match.

Round of 32
August 2 – Los Angeles, CA
**(United States) Los Angeles FC**	**7**
(Mexico) Juárez	1
August 4 – Sandy, UT
(Mexico) León	1
**(United States) Real Salt Lake**	**3**
August 4 – Vancouver, BC
**(Mexico) UANL**	**1 (5)**
(Canada) Vancouver Whitecaps FC	1 (3)
August 4 – Portland, OR
**(Mexico) Monterrey**	**1**
(United States) Portland Timbers	0
August 4 – Columbus, OH
(United States) Columbus Crew	3 (3)
**(United States) Minnesota United FC (p)**	**3 (4)**
August 4 – Kansas City, KS
**(Mexico) Toluca**	**4**
(United States) Sporting Kansas City	1
August 4 – Bridgeview, IL
(United States) Chicago Fire FC	0
**(Mexico) América**	**1**
August 4 – Cincinnati, OH
(United States) FC Cincinnati	1 (4)
**(United States) Nashville SC (p)**	**1 (5)**
August 3 – Chester, PA
**(United States) Philadelphia Union (p)**	**0 (5)**
(United States) D.C. United	0 (4)
August 3 – Harrison, NJ
**(United States) New York Red Bulls**	**1**
(United States) New York City FC	0
August 3 – Washington, D.C.
(Mexico) UNAM	0
**(Mexico) Querétaro**	**1**
August 3 – Foxborough, MA
(Mexico) Atlas	2 (7)
**(United States) New England Revolution (p)**	**2 (8)**
August 2 – Frisco, TX
(Mexico) Mazatlán	1
**(United States) FC Dallas**	**2**
August 2 – Fort Lauderdale, FL
**(United States) Inter Miami CF**	**3**
(United States) Orlando City SC	1
August 2 – Houston, TX
(Mexico) Pachuca	0 (3)
**(United States) Houston Dynamo FC (p)**	**0 (5)**
August 3 – Frisco, TX
**(United States) Charlotte FC (p)**	**0 (4)**
(Mexico) Cruz Azul	0 (3)

Round of 16
August 8 – Los Angeles, CA
**(United States) Los Angeles FC**	**4**
(United States) Real Salt Lake	0
August 8 – Houston, TX
(Mexico) UANL	0
**(Mexico) Monterrey**	**1**
August 8 – Saint Paul, MN
**(United States) Minnesota United FC (p)**	**2 (4)**
(Mexico) Toluca	2 (2)
August 8 – Nashville, TN
(Mexico) América	2 (5)
**(United States) Nashville SC (p)**	**2 (6)**
August 8 – Chester, PA
**(United States) Philadelphia Union (p)**	**1 (4)**
(United States) New York Red Bulls	1 (3)
August 7 – Foxborough, MA
**(Mexico) Querétaro (p)**	**1 (4)**
(United States) New England Revolution	1 (3)
August 6 – Frisco, TX
(United States) FC Dallas	4 (3)
**(United States) Inter Miami CF (p)**	**4 (5)**
August 7 – Houston, TX
(United States) Houston Dynamo FC	1
**(United States) Charlotte FC**	**2**

Quarter-finals
August 11 – Pasadena, CA
(United States) Los Angeles FC	2
**(Mexico) Monterrey**	**3**
August 11 – Nashville, TN
(United States) Minnesota United FC	0
**(United States) Nashville SC**	**5**
August 11 – Chester, PA
**(United States) Philadelphia Union**	**2**
(Mexico) Querétaro	1
August 11 – Fort Lauderdale, FL
**(United States) Inter Miami CF**	**4**
(United States) Charlotte FC	0

Semi-finals
August 15 – Nashville, TN
(Mexico) Monterrey	0
**(United States) Nashville SC**	**2**
August 15 – Chester, PA
(United States) Philadelphia Union	1
**(United States) Inter Miami CF**	**4**

Final
August 19 – Nashville, TN
(United States) Nashville SC	1 (9)
**(United States) Inter Miami CF (p)**	**1 (10)**
Third place play-off
August 19 – Chester, PA
**(United States) Philadelphia Union**	**3**
(Mexico) Monterrey	0

== Round of 32 ==
=== Summary ===
The matches were played from August 2 to 4, 2023.

Team 1	Score	Team 2
Inter Miami CF (United States)	3–1	(United States) Orlando City SC
Mazatlán (Mexico)	1–2	(United States) FC Dallas
Pachuca (Mexico)	0–0 (3–5 p)	(United States) Houston Dynamo FC
Los Angeles FC (United States)	7–1	(Mexico) Juárez
Atlas (Mexico)	2–2 (7–8 p)	(United States) New England Revolution
Philadelphia Union (United States)	0–0 (5–4 p)	(United States) D.C. United
UNAM (Mexico)	0–1	(Mexico) Querétaro
New York Red Bulls (United States)	1–0	(United States) New York City FC
Charlotte FC (United States)	0–0 (4–3 p)	(Mexico) Cruz Azul
León (Mexico)	1–3	(United States) Real Salt Lake
Columbus Crew (United States)	3–3 (3–4 p)	(United States) Minnesota United FC
FC Cincinnati (United States)	1–1 (4–5 p)	(United States) Nashville SC
Chicago Fire FC (United States)	0–1	(Mexico) América
Toluca (Mexico)	4–1	(United States) Sporting Kansas City
Monterrey (Mexico)	1–0	(United States) Portland Timbers
UANL (Mexico)	1–1 (5–3 p)	(Canada) Vancouver Whitecaps FC

=== Matches ===
August 2, 2023
20:00

Inter Miami CF (United States)	3–1	(United States) Orlando City SC
Messi 7', 72'; Martínez 51' (pen.)	Report	Araújo 17'

DRV PNK Stadium, Fort Lauderdale, Florida
Attendance: 20,181
Referee: Iván Barton (El Salvador)

August 2, 2023
21:00 (20:00 UTC−5)

Mazatlán (Mexico)	1–2	(United States) FC Dallas
Montaño 57'	Report	Velasco 48' (pen.); Ansah 75'

Toyota Stadium, Frisco, Texas
Attendance: 6,844
Referee: Oshane Nation (Jamaica)

August 2, 2023
21:00 (20:00 UTC−5)

Pachuca (Mexico)	0–0	(United States) Houston Dynamo FC
	Report
Penalties
Cabral (penalty scored); I. Hernández (penalty scored); Sánchez (penalty scored); Figueroa (penalty missed)	3–5	(penalty scored) Úlfarsson; (penalty scored) Quiñones; (penalty scored) Herrera; (penalty scored) Dorsey; (penalty scored) Caicedo

Shell Energy Stadium, Houston, Texas
Attendance: 10,438
Referee: Edgar Morales Olvera (Mexico)

August 2, 2023
22:30 (19:30 UTC−7)

Los Angeles FC (United States)	7–1	(Mexico) Juárez
Hollingshead 31'; Vela 33', 61'; Bouanga 52', 66', 78' (pen.); Ordaz 90'	Report	Escoto 47'

BMO Stadium, Los Angeles, California
Attendance: 22,041
Referee: Marcos de Oliveira (United States)

August 3, 2023
20:00

Atlas (Mexico)	2–2	(United States) New England Revolution
García 8'; Caicedo 11'	Report	Bou 30', 79'
Penalties
Reyes (penalty scored); Manotas (penalty scored); Lozano (penalty scored); Caicedo (penalty scored); Rocha (penalty scored); Zapata (penalty scored); Trejo (penalty scored); Abella (penalty missed)	7–8	(penalty scored) Vrioni; (penalty scored) Polster; (penalty scored) Jones; (penalty scored) N. Gil; (penalty scored) Bou; (penalty scored) Boateng; (penalty scored) Harkes; (penalty scored) Farrell

Gillette Stadium, Foxborough, Massachusetts
Attendance: 9,299
Referee: Fernando Guerrero (Mexico)

August 3, 2023
20:00

Philadelphia Union (United States)	0–0	(United States) D.C. United
	Report
Penalties
Gazdag (penalty missed); Carranza (penalty scored); Elliott (penalty scored); McGlynn (penalty scored); Bueno (penalty scored); Mbaizo (penalty scored)	5–4	(penalty scored) Benteke; (penalty scored) Klich; (penalty scored) Williams; (penalty missed) Durkin; (penalty scored) Davis; (penalty missed) Pedro Santos

Subaru Park, Chester, Pennsylvania
Attendance: 17,731
Referee: Rosendo Mendoza (United States)

August 3, 2023
20:00

UNAM (Mexico)	0–1	(Mexico) Querétaro
	Report	Sepúlveda 74'

Audi Field, Washington, D.C.
Attendance: 948
Referee: Guido Gonzales Jr. (United States)

August 3, 2023
20:00

New York Red Bulls (United States)	1–0	(United States) New York City FC
Fernandez 31' (pen.)	Report

Red Bull Arena, Harrison, New Jersey
Attendance: 11,004
Referee: Daniel Quintero (Mexico)

August 3, 2023
20:30 (19:30 UTC−5)

Charlotte FC (United States)	0–0	(Mexico) Cruz Azul
	Report
Penalties
Świderski (penalty missed); Bender (penalty scored); Jones (penalty scored); Westwood (penalty missed); Vargas (penalty scored); Privett (penalty scored)	4–3	(penalty scored) Rivero; (penalty missed) Antuna; (penalty missed) Rotondi; (penalty scored) Dueñas; (penalty scored) Rodríguez; (penalty missed) Castaño

Toyota Stadium, Frisco, Texas (Note: Due to a scheduling conflict at Bank of America Stadium, Charlotte FC elected to host their round of 32 match at Toyota Stadium in Frisco, Texas, the home of FC Dallas.)
Attendance: 6,844
Referee: Ismael Cornejo (El Salvador)

August 4, 2023
20:00

Columbus Crew (United States)	3–3	(United States) Minnesota United FC
Amundsen 42'; Mățan 51'; Ramirez 83'	Report	Hlongwane 17', 54'; Dotson 90'
Penalties
Hernández (penalty scored); Ramirez (penalty scored); Mățan (penalty scored); Molino (penalty missed); Moreira (penalty missed); Amundsen (penalty missed)	3–4	(penalty scored) Reynoso; (penalty scored) Rosales; (penalty scored) Boxall; (penalty missed) García; (penalty missed) Hlongwane; (penalty scored) Tapias

Lower.com Field, Columbus, Ohio
Attendance: 20,217
Referee: Reon Radix (Grenada)

August 4, 2023
20:00

FC Cincinnati (United States)	1–1	(United States) Nashville SC
Vazquez 85' (pen.)	Report	Godoy 64'
Penalties
Acosta (penalty scored); Vazquez (penalty scored); Miazga (penalty missed); Kubo (penalty scored); Barreal (penalty scored)	4–5	(penalty scored) Mukhtar; (penalty scored) Picault; (penalty scored) Godoy; (penalty scored) Zimmerman; (penalty scored) McCarty

TQL Stadium, Cincinnati, Ohio
Attendance: 19,911
Referee: Nima Saghafi (United States)

August 4, 2023
20:00 (19:00 UTC−5)

Chicago Fire FC (United States)	0–1	(Mexico) América
	Report	Giménez 64' (o.g.)

SeatGeek Stadium, Bridgeview, Illinois
Attendance: 18,417
Referee: Walter López (Guatemala)

August 4, 2023
21:00 (20:00 UTC−5)

Toluca (Mexico)	4–1	(United States) Sporting Kansas City
Rosero 29' (o.g.); Raul 32'; Morales 54'; Domínguez 63'	Report	Agada 88'

Children's Mercy Park, Kansas City, Kansas
Attendance: 15,121
Referee: Jorge Camacho (Mexico)

August 4, 2023 (Note: The match between León and Real Salt Lake was originally scheduled to begin on August 3 at 20:30 UTC–6, but was postponed to August 4 due to inclement weather near the stadium.)
21:00 (19:00 UTC−6)

León (Mexico)	1–3	(United States) Real Salt Lake
Moreno 8'	Report	Musovski 69', 71'; Arango 81'

America First Field, Sandy, Utah
Attendance: 17,436
Referee: Benjamín Pineda (Costa Rica)

August 4, 2023
22:00 (19:00 UTC−7)

Monterrey (Mexico)	1–0	(United States) Portland Timbers
Meza 45+1'	Report

Providence Park, Portland, Oregon
Attendance: 18,770
Referee: Guillermo Pacheco (Mexico)

August 4, 2023
22:30 (19:30 UTC−7)

UANL (Mexico)	1–1	(Canada) Vancouver Whitecaps FC
Gignac 53'	Report	Vite 9'
Penalties
Gignac (penalty scored); Ibáñez (penalty scored); Angulo (penalty scored); Córdova (penalty scored); Gorriarán (penalty scored)	5–3	(penalty scored) Vite; (penalty scored) Córdova; (penalty scored) White; (penalty missed) Veselinović

BC Place, Vancouver, British Columbia
Attendance: 13,703
Referee: Lukasz Szpala (United States)

== Round of 16 ==
=== Summary ===
The matches were played from August 6 to 8, 2023.

Team 1	Score	Team 2
FC Dallas (United States)	4–4 (3–5 p)	(United States) Inter Miami CF
Querétaro (Mexico)	1–1 (4–3 p)	(United States) New England Revolution
Charlotte FC (United States)	2–1	(United States) Houston Dynamo FC
América (Mexico)	2–2 (5–6 p)	(United States) Nashville SC
Philadelphia Union (United States)	1–1 (4–3 p)	(United States) New York Red Bulls
Toluca (Mexico)	2–2 (2–4 p)	(United States) Minnesota United FC
UANL (Mexico)	0–1	(Mexico) Monterrey
Los Angeles FC (United States)	4–0	(United States) Real Salt Lake

=== Matches ===
August 6, 2023
21:30 (20:30 UTC−5)

FC Dallas (United States)	4–4	(United States) Inter Miami CF
Quignón 37'; Kamungo 45'; Velasco 63'; Taylor 68' (o.g.)	Report	Messi 6', 85'; Cremaschi 65'; Farfan 80' (o.g.)
Penalties
Arriola (penalty scored); Pomykal (penalty missed); Quignón (penalty scored); Ferreira (penalty scored)	3–5	(penalty scored) Messi; (penalty scored) Busquets; (penalty scored) Campana; (penalty scored) Miller; (penalty scored) Cremaschi

Toyota Stadium, Frisco, Texas
Attendance: 19,096
Referee: César Ramos (Mexico)

August 7, 2023
20:00

Querétaro (Mexico)	1–1	(United States) New England Revolution
Gómez 46'	Report	Bajraktarević 78'
Penalties
Sepúlveda (penalty scored); Escamilla (penalty scored); Torres (penalty scored); Lértora (penalty scored)	4–3	(penalty scored) Vrioni; (penalty scored) Polster; (penalty scored) Jones; (penalty missed) N. Gil; (penalty missed) Harkes

Gillette Stadium, Foxborough, Massachusetts
Attendance: 8,895
Referee: Daniel Quintero (Mexico)

August 7, 2023
22:00 (21:00 UTC−5)

Charlotte FC (United States)	2–1	(United States) Houston Dynamo FC
Agyemang 80'; Micael 81' (o.g.)	Report	Baird 10'

Shell Energy Stadium, Houston, Texas
Attendance: 9,188
Referee: Pierre-Luc Lauzière (Canada)

August 8, 2023 (Note: The match between the Philadelphia Union and the New York Red Bulls was originally scheduled to start on August 7 at 19:30, but was postponed to August 8 due to forecasted thunderstorms.)
20:00

Philadelphia Union (United States)	1–1	(United States) New York Red Bulls
Harriel 68'	Report	Elias 4'
Penalties
Elliott (penalty scored); Uhre (penalty scored); McGlynn (penalty missed); Carranza (penalty scored); Bueno (penalty scored)	4–3	(penalty missed) Morgan; (penalty scored) Amaya; (penalty missed) Edelman; (penalty scored) S. Nealis; (penalty scored) Tolkin

Subaru Park, Chester, Pennsylvania
Attendance: 10,279
Referee: Víctor Cáceres (Mexico)

August 8, 2023
20:00 (19:00 UTC−5)

América (Mexico)	2–2	(United States) Nashville SC
Valdés 78'; Quiñones 90+4' (pen.)	Report	Zimmerman 61'; Surridge 90+9'
Penalties
Quiñones (penalty scored); Layún (penalty missed); Zendejas (penalty scored); I. Reyes (penalty scored); Valdés (penalty scored); Fidalgo (penalty scored); Dos Santos (penalty missed)	5–6	(penalty missed) Mukhtar; (penalty scored) Surridge; (penalty scored) Godoy; (penalty scored) Zimmerman; (penalty scored) McCarty; (penalty scored) Maher; (penalty scored) Lovitz

Geodis Park, Nashville, Tennessee
Attendance: 24,662
Referee: Selvin Brown (Honduras)

August 8, 2023
20:30 (19:30 UTC−5)

Toluca (Mexico)	2–2	(United States) Minnesota United FC
Huerta 66'; Volpi 75'	Report	Rosales 13'; Hlongwane 32'
Penalties
Volpi (penalty scored); Huerta (penalty missed); Baeza (penalty scored); Morales (penalty missed)	2–4	(penalty scored) Reynoso; (penalty scored) Boxall; (penalty scored) Trapp; (penalty scored) Jeong

Allianz Field, Saint Paul, Minnesota
Attendance: 18,187
Referee: Victor Rivas (United States)

August 8, 2023
22:00 (21:00 UTC−5)

UANL (Mexico)	0–1	(Mexico) Monterrey
	Report	Canales 90+7' (pen.)

Shell Energy Stadium, Houston, Texas
Attendance: 20,104
Referee: Ismail Elfath (United States)

August 8, 2023
22:00 (19:00 UTC−7)

Los Angeles FC (United States)	4–0	(United States) Real Salt Lake
Bouanga 52', 56'; Ordaz 62'; Krastev 84'	Report

BMO Stadium, Los Angeles, California
Attendance: 17,728
Referee: Rubiel Vazquez (United States)

== Quarter-finals ==
=== Summary ===
The matches were played on August 11, 2023.

Team 1	Score	Team 2
Inter Miami CF (United States)	4–0	(United States) Charlotte FC
Nashville SC (United States)	5–0	(United States) Minnesota United FC
Philadelphia Union (United States)	2–1	(Mexico) Querétaro
Los Angeles FC (United States)	2–3	(Mexico) Monterrey

=== Matches ===
August 11, 2023
20:30

Inter Miami CF (United States)	4–0	(United States) Charlotte FC
Martínez 12' (pen.); Taylor 32'; Malanda 78' (o.g.); Messi 86'	Report

DRV PNK Stadium, Fort Lauderdale, Florida
Attendance: 20,368
Referee: Ismail Elfath (United States)

August 11, 2023
20:30 (19:30 UTC−5)

Nashville SC (United States)	5–0	(United States) Minnesota United FC
Moore 39'; Bunbury 44'; Muyl 50'; Surridge 53'; Mukhtar 59'	Report

Geodis Park, Nashville, Tennessee
Attendance: 19,915
Referee: Juan Gabriel Calderón (Costa Rica)

August 11, 2023
21:09 (Note: The match between the Philadelphia Union and Querétaro was originally scheduled to start at 20:00, but was delayed to 21:09 due to a power outage at Subaru Park.)

Philadelphia Union (United States)	2–1	(Mexico) Querétaro
Bueno 10'; Donovan 90+11'	Report	Sepúlveda 65'

Subaru Park, Chester, Pennsylvania
Attendance: 17,731
Referee: Mario Escobar (Guatemala)

August 11, 2023
23:00 (20:30 UTC−7)

Los Angeles FC (United States)	2–3	(Mexico) Monterrey
Bouanga 2' (pen.); Bogusz 42'	Report	Canales 68' (pen.); Palencia 80' (o.g.); Funes Mori 88'

Rose Bowl, Pasadena, California (Note: Due to a scheduled concert at BMO Stadium, Los Angeles FC hosted their quarter-final match at the Rose Bowl.)
Attendance: 15,649
Referee: Saíd Martínez (Honduras)

== Semi-finals ==
=== Summary ===
The matches were played on August 15, 2023.

Team 1	Score	Team 2
Philadelphia Union (United States)	1–4	(United States) Inter Miami CF
Monterrey (Mexico)	0–2	(United States) Nashville SC

=== Matches ===
August 15, 2023
19:00

Philadelphia Union (United States)	1–4	(United States) Inter Miami CF
Bedoya 73'	Report	Martínez 3'; Messi 20'; Alba 45+3'; Ruiz 84'

Subaru Park, Chester, Pennsylvania
Attendance: 19,778
Referee: Daniel Quintero (Mexico)

August 15, 2023
21:30 (20:30 UTC−5)

Monterrey (Mexico)	0–2	(United States) Nashville SC
	Report	Surridge 67'; Picault 90+6'

Geodis Park, Nashville, Tennessee
Attendance: 27,732
Referee: Walter López (Guatemala)

== Third place play-off ==
The winner of the third place play-off qualified for the first round of the 2024 CONCACAF Champions Cup.

August 19, 2023
18:00

Philadelphia Union (United States)	3–0	(Mexico) Monterrey
Bueno 1'; Uhre 45+2'; Bedoya 69'	Report

Subaru Park, Chester, Pennsylvania
Attendance: 17,731
Referee: Juan Gabriel Calderón (Costa Rica)

== Final ==
Both clubs in the final qualified for the 2024 CONCACAF Champions Cup, with the winners qualifying directly to the round of 16.

August 19, 2023
8:00 p.m. CDT

Nashville SC (United States)	1–1	(United States) Inter Miami CF
Picault 57'	Report	Messi 23'
Penalties
Mukhtar (penalty scored); Leal (penalty missed); Godoy (penalty scored); Zimmerman (penalty scored); Surridge (penalty scored); Moore (penalty scored); Lovitz (penalty scored); MacNaughton (penalty scored); Davis (penalty scored); Shaffelburg (penalty scored); Panicco (penalty missed)	9–10	(penalty scored) Messi; (penalty scored) Busquets; (penalty scored) Campana; (penalty scored) Miller; (penalty missed) Ulloa; (penalty scored) Kryvtsov; (penalty scored) Alba; (penalty scored) Gómez; (penalty scored) Ruiz; (penalty scored) Yedlin; (penalty scored) Callender

Geodis Park, Nashville, Tennessee
Attendance: 30,109
Referee: Ismail Elfath (United States)
