= 2023 Leagues Cup =

Soccer tournament held in Canada and the United States

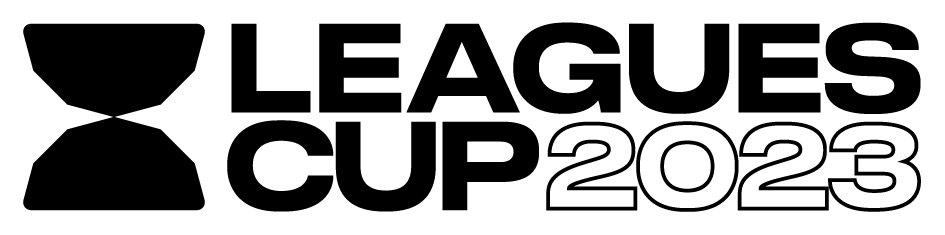

Tournament details
- Host countries: Canada; United States
- Dates: July 21 – August 19
- Teams: 47 (from 3 associations)
- Venues: 30 (in 30 host cities)

Final positions
- Champions: (United States) Inter Miami CF (1st title)
- Runners-up: (United States) Nashville SC
- Third place: (United States) Philadelphia Union
- Fourth place: (Mexico) Monterrey

Tournament statistics
- Matches played: 77
- Goals scored: 251 (3.26 per match)
- Attendance: 1,328,669 (17,255 per match)
- Top scorer(s): (Argentina) Lionel Messi (10 goals)
- Best player: (Argentina) Lionel Messi
- Best goalkeeper: (United States) Drake Callender

The 2023 Leagues Cup was the third edition of the Leagues Cup, an international club soccer tournament between Major League Soccer (MLS) and Liga MX. It was held from July 21 to August 19, 2023, with all 77 matches held in either Canada or the United States. The tournament was organized by the two leagues (MLS and Liga MX) and sanctioned by CONCACAF, the continental governing body for the sport in North America, Central America and Caribbean.

Inter Miami CF won the tournament after defeating Nashville SC on penalties in the final at Geodis Park in Nashville, Tennessee. The tournament was also memorable because it featured Argentina's 2022 FIFA World Cup-winning captain Lionel Messi's debut for Inter Miami after joining from Paris Saint-Germain when Miami was at the bottom of the MLS Eastern Conference. Messi earned the Leagues Cup 2023 Top Scorer and Best Player Awards. This also marked Inter Miami's first trophy in any competition.

For the first time in the history of the competition, all MLS and Liga MX teams (47 total) competed in the tournament, with both leagues taking a pause in their respective seasons to participate. In addition, the Leagues Cup finalists and third-place team earned berths to the 2024 CONCACAF Champions Cup, with winners Inter Miami automatically advancing to that tournament's round of 16.

== Format ==
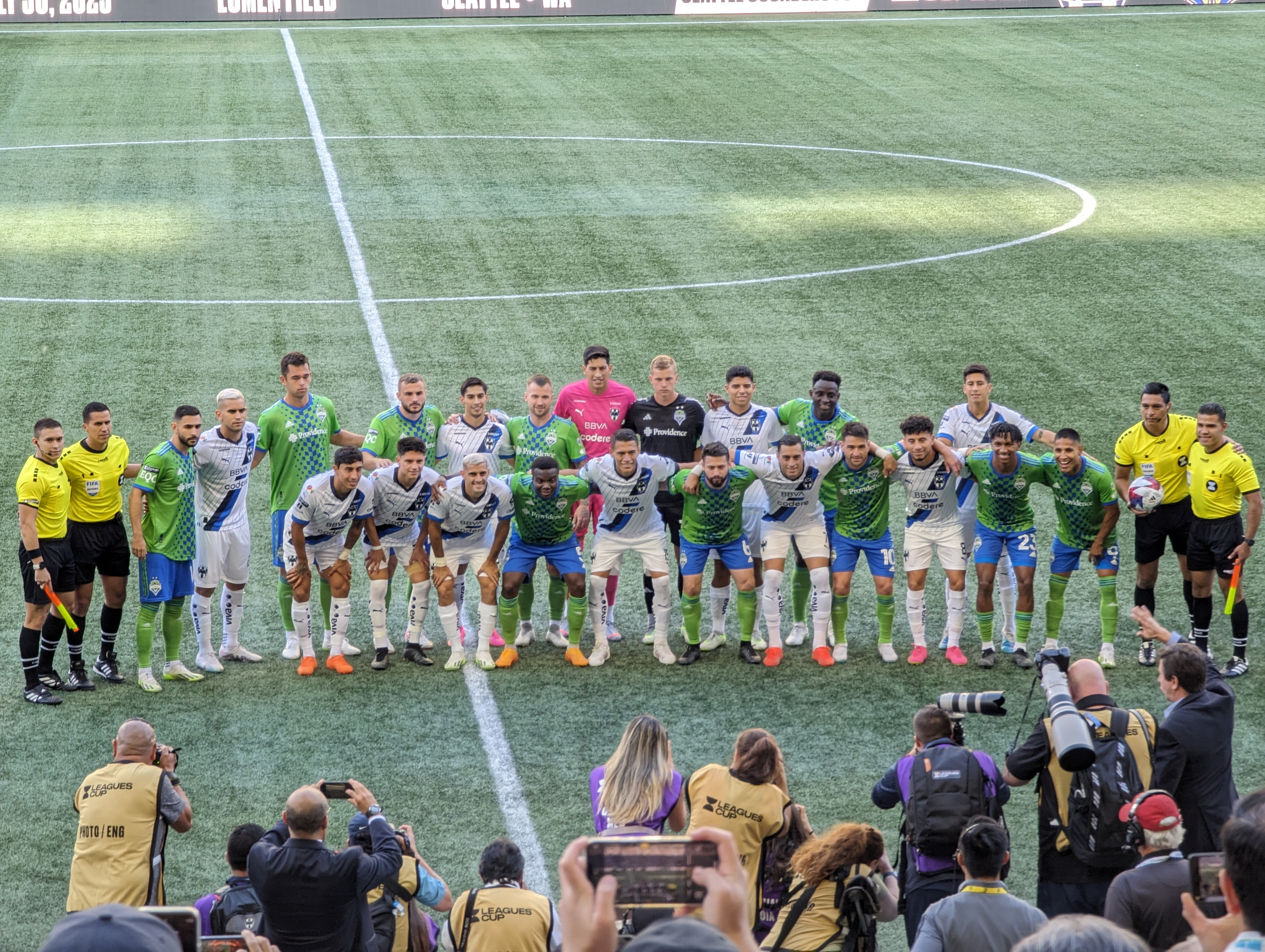
The starting lineups of Seattle Sounders FC (in green) and Monterrey (in white) prior to their group stage match

The 2023 Leagues Cup was the first edition where all MLS and Liga MX teams participated. The MLS Cup 2022 winners (Los Angeles FC) and the 2022 Clausura or 2022 Apertura champions with the highest aggregate points accumulated across 2022 (Pachuca) qualified automatically for the round of 32. The remaining 45 teams were placed into 15 groups of three.

For the group stage, teams played one match against each team in their group. Regulation wins were worth three points and regulation losses are zero points. Matches tied after 90 minutes advanced to a penalty shoot-out, where the winner earned two points and the loser earned one. All matches were held in either Canada and United States, with the MLS teams playing at home and intra-Liga MX matches played at MLS venues depending on their region. Matches disrupted by inclement weather, including thunderstorms, were delayed or postponed to another date to resume at the time of the stoppage.

Tie-breaking criteria for group play
The ranking of teams in the group stage was determined as follows:
1. Points obtained in all group matches;
2. Direct head-to-head match result between the tied clubs (for clarity, a victory on penalties was considered a win for purposes of this tiebreaker);
3. Better goal differential between goals scored and goals conceded during the group stage;
4. Greater number of goals scored during the group stage;
5. Fewer number of goals conceded during the group stage;
6. Clubs fair play table
  - First yellow card: –1 point
  - Second yellow card (indirect red card): –3 points (The first yellow card was not considered)
  - Direct red card: –3 points
  - Yellow card followed by a direct red card: –4 points;
7. A draw organized by the organizing committee.

The top two teams in each group advanced to the round of 32, joining the MLS Cup winners and highest-ranked Liga MX champion. This phase of the tournament was a five-round single-leg knockout format with a third place match. As was the case during the group stage, knockout stage matches tied after 90 minutes were decided by a penalty shoot-out. The two finalists and third place team earned berths for the 2024 CONCACAF Champions Cup, with the winners automatically advancing to the Champions Cup round of 16.

== Teams and draw ==
The competition featured all 47 clubs from the two leagues: 29 from MLS and 18 from Liga MX. Teams were ranked by league using the 2022 Supporters' Shield table for MLS and the 2022 aggregate table for Liga MX. The champions of each league received a bye to the knockout stage as the highest seed. The top 15 remaining teams from each league were placed into groups based on ranking and in reverse order (for example, the 2nd-ranked MLS club was drawn against the 16th-ranked Liga MX club). The remaining teams (13 MLS and 2 Liga MX) were drawn into groups and divided into geographical regions. The first two teams of every group were seeded. The third team was the nearest geographically located unseeded team to the other two teams.

MLS (2022 Supporters' Shield table)
Rank	Team	Pot
1	Los Angeles FC	Bye
2	Philadelphia Union	Seeded
3	CF Montréal	Seeded
4	Austin FC	Seeded
5	New York City FC	Seeded
6	New York Red Bulls	Seeded
7	FC Dallas	Seeded
8	LA Galaxy	Seeded
9	Nashville SC	Seeded
10	FC Cincinnati	Seeded
11	Minnesota United FC	Seeded
12	Inter Miami CF	Seeded
13	Orlando City SC	Seeded
14	Real Salt Lake	Seeded
15	Portland Timbers	Seeded
16	Columbus Crew	Seeded
17	Vancouver Whitecaps FC	Unseeded
18	Colorado Rapids	Unseeded
19	Charlotte FC	Unseeded
20	New England Revolution	Unseeded
21	Seattle Sounders FC	Unseeded
22	Sporting Kansas City	Unseeded
23	Atlanta United FC	Unseeded
24	Chicago Fire FC	Unseeded
25	Houston Dynamo FC	Unseeded
26	San Jose Earthquakes	Unseeded
27	Toronto FC	Unseeded
28	D.C. United	Unseeded
–	St. Louis City SC	Unseeded

Liga MX (2022 aggregate table)
Rank	Team	Pot
1	Pachuca	Bye
2	América	Seeded
3	UANL	Seeded
4	Monterrey	Seeded
5	Santos Laguna	Seeded
6	Cruz Azul	Seeded
7	Puebla	Seeded
8	Guadalajara	Seeded
9	Toluca	Seeded
10	León	Seeded
11	Necaxa	Seeded
12	Atlético San Luis	Seeded
13	Atlas	Seeded
14	Mazatlán	Seeded
15	UNAM	Seeded
16	Tijuana	Seeded
17	Juárez	Unseeded
18	Querétaro	Unseeded

Teams receiving bye to knockout stage.
Teams assigned to a group based on league ranking.
Teams drawn into a group.
1. St. Louis City SC joined Major League Soccer in 2023 and therefore had no 2022 season ranking.

== Schedule ==
The schedule of the competition was as follows:

Schedule for 2023 Leagues Cup
Phase	Round	Date
Group stage	Matchday 1	July 21–23, 2023
Group stage	Matchday 2	July 25–27, 2023
Group stage	Matchday 3	July 29–31, 2023
Knockout stage	Round of 32	August 2–4, 2023
Knockout stage	Round of 16	August 6–8, 2023
Knockout stage	Quarter-finals	August 11–12, 2023
Knockout stage	Semi-finals	August 15, 2023
Knockout stage	Third place play-off	August 19, 2023
Knockout stage	Final	August 19, 2023

== Group stage ==
The group stage was played from July 21 to 31. Competing teams were divided into fifteen groups of three teams. Teams in each group played one another in a single round-robin, where the top two teams advanced to the knockout stage.

=== West ===
West 1

Pos	Team	Pld	Pts
1	(Mexico) UANL	2	6
2	(United States) Portland Timbers	2	3
3	(United States) San Jose Earthquakes	2	0

Source: Leagues Cup
West 2

Pos	Team	Pld	Pts
1	(Mexico) Monterrey	2	6
2	(United States) Real Salt Lake	2	3
3	(United States) Seattle Sounders FC	2	0

Source: Leagues Cup
West 3

Pos	Team	Pld	Pts
1	(Mexico) León	2	5
2	(Canada) Vancouver Whitecaps FC	2	4
3	(United States) LA Galaxy	2	0

Source: Leagues Cup

=== Central ===
Central 1
Central 2

Pos	Team	Pld	Pts
1	(United States) Columbus Crew	2	6
2	(Mexico) América	2	3
3	(United States) St. Louis City SC	2	0

Source: Leagues Cup

Pos	Team	Pld	Pts
1	(United States) Chicago Fire FC	2	4
2	(United States) Minnesota United FC	2	3
3	(Mexico) Puebla	2	2

Source: Leagues Cup
Central 3
Central 4

Pos	Team	Pld	Pts
1	(United States) FC Cincinnati	2	5
2	(United States) Sporting Kansas City	2	4
3	(Mexico) Guadalajara	2	0

Source: Leagues Cup

Pos	Team	Pld	Pts
1	(Mexico) Toluca	2	6
2	(United States) Nashville SC	2	3
3	(United States) Colorado Rapids	2	0

Source: Leagues Cup

=== South ===
South 1
South 2

Pos	Team	Pld	Pts
1	(Mexico) Mazatlán	2	5
2	(Mexico) Juárez	2	4
3	(United States) Austin FC	2	0

Source: Leagues Cup

Pos	Team	Pld	Pts
1	(United States) Orlando City SC	2	5
2	(United States) Houston Dynamo FC	2	3
3	(Mexico) Santos Laguna	2	1

Source: Leagues Cup
South 3
South 4

Pos	Team	Pld	Pts
1	(United States) Inter Miami CF	2	6
2	(Mexico) Cruz Azul	2	2
3	(United States) Atlanta United FC	2	1

Source: Leagues Cup

Pos	Team	Pld	Pts
1	(United States) Charlotte FC	2	5
2	(United States) FC Dallas	2	4
3	(Mexico) Necaxa	2	0

Source: Leagues Cup

=== East ===
East 1
East 2

Pos	Team	Pld	Pts
1	(United States) Philadelphia Union	2	6
2	(Mexico) Querétaro	2	3
3	(Mexico) Tijuana	2	0

Source: Leagues Cup

Pos	Team	Pld	Pts
1	(Mexico) UNAM	2	4
2	(United States) D.C. United	2	3
3	(Canada) CF Montréal	2	2

Source: Leagues Cup
East 3
East 4

Pos	Team	Pld	Pts
1	(Mexico) Atlas	2	6
2	(United States) New York City FC	2	3
3	(Canada) Toronto FC	2	0

Source: Leagues Cup

Pos	Team	Pld	Pts
1	(United States) New York Red Bulls	2	5
2	(United States) New England Revolution	2	4
3	(Mexico) Atlético San Luis	2	0

Source: Leagues Cup

== Knockout stage ==
In the knockout stage, if the scores were equal at the end of regulation time, a penalty shoot-out was used to determine the winners.

The host team was determined by several criteria, including group winner for round of 32 and the 2022 regular season standings for matches between two MLS clubs, where the team with the higher number of points hosted starting in round of 16. For MLS vs. Liga MX matches, the MLS club hosted. Matches between two Liga MX teams were hosted at a neutral venue appointed by the Organizing Committee from a predetermined list.

=== Bracket ===
Round of 32
August 2 – Los Angeles, CA
(United States) Los Angeles FC	7
(Mexico) Juárez	1
August 4 – Sandy, UT
(Mexico) León	1
(United States) Real Salt Lake	3
August 4 – Vancouver, BC
(Mexico) UANL	1 (5)
(Canada) Vancouver Whitecaps FC	1 (3)
August 4 – Portland, OR
(Mexico) Monterrey	1
(United States) Portland Timbers	0
August 4 – Columbus, OH
(United States) Columbus Crew	3 (3)
(United States) Minnesota United FC (p)	3 (4)
August 4 – Kansas City, KS
(Mexico) Toluca	4
(United States) Sporting Kansas City	1
August 4 – Bridgeview, IL
(United States) Chicago Fire FC	0
(Mexico) América	1
August 4 – Cincinnati, OH
(United States) FC Cincinnati	1 (4)
(United States) Nashville SC (p)	1 (5)
August 3 – Chester, PA
(United States) Philadelphia Union (p)	0 (5)
(United States) D.C. United	0 (4)
August 3 – Harrison, NJ
(United States) New York Red Bulls	1
(United States) New York City FC	0
August 3 – Washington, D.C.
(Mexico) UNAM	0
(Mexico) Querétaro	1
August 3 – Foxborough, MA
(Mexico) Atlas	2 (7)
(United States) New England Revolution (p)	2 (8)
August 2 – Frisco, TX
(Mexico) Mazatlán	1
(United States) FC Dallas	2
August 2 – Fort Lauderdale, FL
(United States) Inter Miami CF	3
(United States) Orlando City SC	1
August 2 – Houston, TX
(Mexico) Pachuca	0 (3)
(United States) Houston Dynamo FC (p)	0 (5)
August 3 – Frisco, TX
(United States) Charlotte FC (p)	0 (4)
(Mexico) Cruz Azul	0 (3)

Round of 16
August 8 – Los Angeles, CA
(United States) Los Angeles FC	4
(United States) Real Salt Lake	0
August 8 – Houston, TX
(Mexico) UANL	0
(Mexico) Monterrey	1
August 8 – Saint Paul, MN
(United States) Minnesota United FC (p)	2 (4)
(Mexico) Toluca	2 (2)
August 8 – Nashville, TN
(Mexico) América	2 (5)
(United States) Nashville SC (p)	2 (6)
August 8 – Chester, PA
(United States) Philadelphia Union (p)	1 (4)
(United States) New York Red Bulls	1 (3)
August 7 – Foxborough, MA
(Mexico) Querétaro (p)	1 (4)
(United States) New England Revolution	1 (3)
August 6 – Frisco, TX
(United States) FC Dallas	4 (3)
(United States) Inter Miami CF (p)	4 (5)
August 7 – Houston, TX
(United States) Houston Dynamo FC	1
(United States) Charlotte FC	2

Quarter-finals
August 11 – Pasadena, CA
(United States) Los Angeles FC	2
(Mexico) Monterrey	3
August 11 – Nashville, TN
(United States) Minnesota United FC	0
(United States) Nashville SC	5
August 11 – Chester, PA
(United States) Philadelphia Union	2
(Mexico) Querétaro	1
August 11 – Fort Lauderdale, FL
(United States) Inter Miami CF	4
(United States) Charlotte FC	0

Semi-finals
August 15 – Nashville, TN
(Mexico) Monterrey	0
(United States) Nashville SC	2
August 15 – Chester, PA
(United States) Philadelphia Union	1
(United States) Inter Miami CF	4

Final
August 19 – Nashville, TN
(United States) Nashville SC	1 (9)
(United States) Inter Miami CF (p)	1 (10)
Third place play-off
August 19 – Chester, PA
(United States) Philadelphia Union	3
(Mexico) Monterrey	0

=== Round of 32 ===
The matches were played from August 2 to 4, 2023.

Team 1	Score	Team 2
Inter Miami CF (United States)	3–1	(United States) Orlando City SC
Mazatlán (Mexico)	1–2	(United States) FC Dallas
Pachuca (Mexico)	0–0 (3–5 p)	(United States) Houston Dynamo FC
Los Angeles FC (United States)	7–1	(Mexico) Juárez
Atlas (Mexico)	2–2 (7–8 p)	(United States) New England Revolution
Philadelphia Union (United States)	0–0 (5–4 p)	(United States) D.C. United
UNAM (Mexico)	0–1	(Mexico) Querétaro
New York Red Bulls (United States)	1–0	(United States) New York City FC
Charlotte FC (United States)	0–0 (4–3 p)	(Mexico) Cruz Azul
León (Mexico)	1–3	(United States) Real Salt Lake
Columbus Crew (United States)	3–3 (3–4 p)	(United States) Minnesota United FC
FC Cincinnati (United States)	1–1 (4–5 p)	(United States) Nashville SC
Chicago Fire FC (United States)	0–1	(Mexico) América
Toluca (Mexico)	4–1	(United States) Sporting Kansas City
Monterrey (Mexico)	1–0	(United States) Portland Timbers
UANL (Mexico)	1–1 (5–3 p)	(Canada) Vancouver Whitecaps FC

=== Round of 16 ===
The matches were played from August 6 to 8, 2023.

Team 1	Score	Team 2
FC Dallas (United States)	4–4 (3–5 p)	(United States) Inter Miami CF
Querétaro (Mexico)	1–1 (4–3 p)	(United States) New England Revolution
Charlotte FC (United States)	2–1	(United States) Houston Dynamo FC
América (Mexico)	2–2 (5–6 p)	(United States) Nashville SC
Philadelphia Union (United States)	1–1 (4–3 p)	(United States) New York Red Bulls
Toluca (Mexico)	2–2 (2–4 p)	(United States) Minnesota United FC
UANL (Mexico)	0–1	(Mexico) Monterrey
Los Angeles FC (United States)	4–0	(United States) Real Salt Lake

=== Quarter-finals ===
The matches were played on August 11, 2023.

Team 1	Score	Team 2
Inter Miami CF (United States)	4–0	(United States) Charlotte FC
Nashville SC (United States)	5–0	(United States) Minnesota United FC
Philadelphia Union (United States)	2–1	(Mexico) Querétaro
Los Angeles FC (United States)	2–3	(Mexico) Monterrey

=== Semi-finals ===
The matches were played on August 15, 2023.

Team 1	Score	Team 2
Philadelphia Union (United States)	1–4	(United States) Inter Miami CF
Monterrey (Mexico)	0–2	(United States) Nashville SC

=== Third place play-off ===
The winner of the third place play-off qualified for the first round of the 2024 CONCACAF Champions Cup.

August 19, 2023
18:00

Philadelphia Union (United States)	3–0	(Mexico) Monterrey
Bueno 1'; Uhre 45+2'; Bedoya 69'	Report

Subaru Park, Chester, Pennsylvania
Attendance: 17,731
Referee: Juan Gabriel Calderón (Costa Rica)

=== Final ===
Both clubs qualified for the 2024 CONCACAF Champions Cup, with the winners qualifying directly to the round of 16.

August 19, 2023
8:00 p.m. CDT

Nashville SC (United States)	1–1	(United States) Inter Miami CF
Picault 57'	Report	Messi 23'
Penalties
Mukhtar (penalty scored); Leal (penalty missed); Godoy (penalty scored); Zimmerman (penalty scored); Surridge (penalty scored); Moore (penalty scored); Lovitz (penalty scored); MacNaughton (penalty scored); Davis (penalty scored); Shaffelburg (penalty scored); Panicco (penalty missed)	9–10	(penalty scored) Messi; (penalty scored) Busquets; (penalty scored) Campana; (penalty scored) Miller; (penalty missed) Ulloa; (penalty scored) Kryvtsov; (penalty scored) Alba; (penalty scored) Gómez; (penalty scored) Ruiz; (penalty scored) Yedlin; (penalty scored) Callender

Geodis Park, Nashville, Tennessee
Attendance: 30,109
Referee: Ismail Elfath (United States)

== Statistics ==
=== Top goalscorers ===
Team eliminated for this round.
Player was inactive for this round.

Rank	Player	Team	MD1	MD2	MD3	R32	R16	QF	SF	3rd	F	Total
1	(Argentina) Lionel Messi	(United States) Inter Miami CF	1	2		2	2	1	1		1	10
2	(South Africa) Bongokuhle Hlongwane	(United States) Minnesota United FC	2	2		2	1					7
3	(Gabon) Denis Bouanga	(United States) Los Angeles FC				3	2	1				6
4	(Argentina) Germán Berterame	(Mexico) Monterrey		2	3							5
4	(United States) Brandon Vázquez	(United States) FC Cincinnati	1	3		1						5
6	(Hungary) Dániel Gazdag	(United States) Philadelphia Union	1	3								4
6	(Finland) Robert Taylor	(United States) Inter Miami CF	1	2				1				4
8	(Argentina) Gustavo Bou	(United States) New England Revolution		1		2						3
8	(Colombia) Cucho Hernández	(United States) Columbus Crew	1		2							3
8	(Venezuela) Josef Martínez	(United States) Inter Miami CF				1		1	1			3
8	(Haiti) Fafà Picault	(United States) Nashville SC		1					1		1	3
8	(Colombia) Harold Preciado	(Mexico) Santos Laguna		2	1							3
8	(England) Sam Surridge	(United States) Nashville SC					1	1	1			3
8	(Albania) Giacomo Vrioni	(United States) New England Revolution		3								3

== Marketing and symbols ==
The official song of the tournament was "Tiki Taka Toco", sung in Spanish by California-based Mexicana group Fuerza Regida. A short instrumental version of the song is used for match broadcasts on MLS Season Pass as well as advertisements and stadium announcements. The marketing for the tournament focused heavily on the arrival of Lionel Messi at Inter Miami CF, which was credited with increasing subscriptions and viewership; on the day of Messi's debut for Miami, subscriptions to MLS Season Pass rose by 110,000 in the United States.

== Controversies ==
This edition received accusations of being designed to favor MLS teams. Most notably, the fact that all matches were played at MLS venues in Canada or United States. Some Mexican coaches and players considered the format unfair, since there were no games in Mexico. For example, Nicolás Larcamón, coach of Club León stated: "there is a benefit for the MLS teams, on their field, in their environment, in their climate. I would love to have a second game in León, It would be ideal to play in both stadiums to equilibrate the balance".

The Mexican (and LAFC) player Carlos Vela declared: "Obviously, for me, the fairest thing is we should also had games in Mexico, that it shouldn't be all playing in the United States, so that everyone could had a little bit of playing away, at home, and being a little more even" he also added: "Not only does (being local) benefit, the Mexican team has to be away from their home and their families for a long time and it is not fair. I believe that, if you hold a tournament, everyone must have the same possibilities, or the same advantages and disadvantages, in that aspect I think that those from the MLS have a little more advantage, (Although) in the end we know that anything can happen on the field".

Noticeably, this was also reflected in a greater travel effort for the Mexican squads since the 18 Liga MX clubs traveled more than twice as many kilometers as all 29 in the MLS. Mexicans added an estimated 69,495 km; while combined Americans and Canadians, only 33,995. The criticism was more severe from the president of Club Monterrey, who, prior to their match against Los Angeles FC, pointed out that the Mexicans had moved more than 9,000 km, while throughout the Leagues Cup the team from the MLS had not left the Los Angeles metropolitan area.

"It'll be our fifth game (traveling), while LA(FC) will be home with their players eating dinner with their families every night, going to the movies, resting," he stated.
