= Mathieu Choinière =

Canadian soccer player (born 1999)

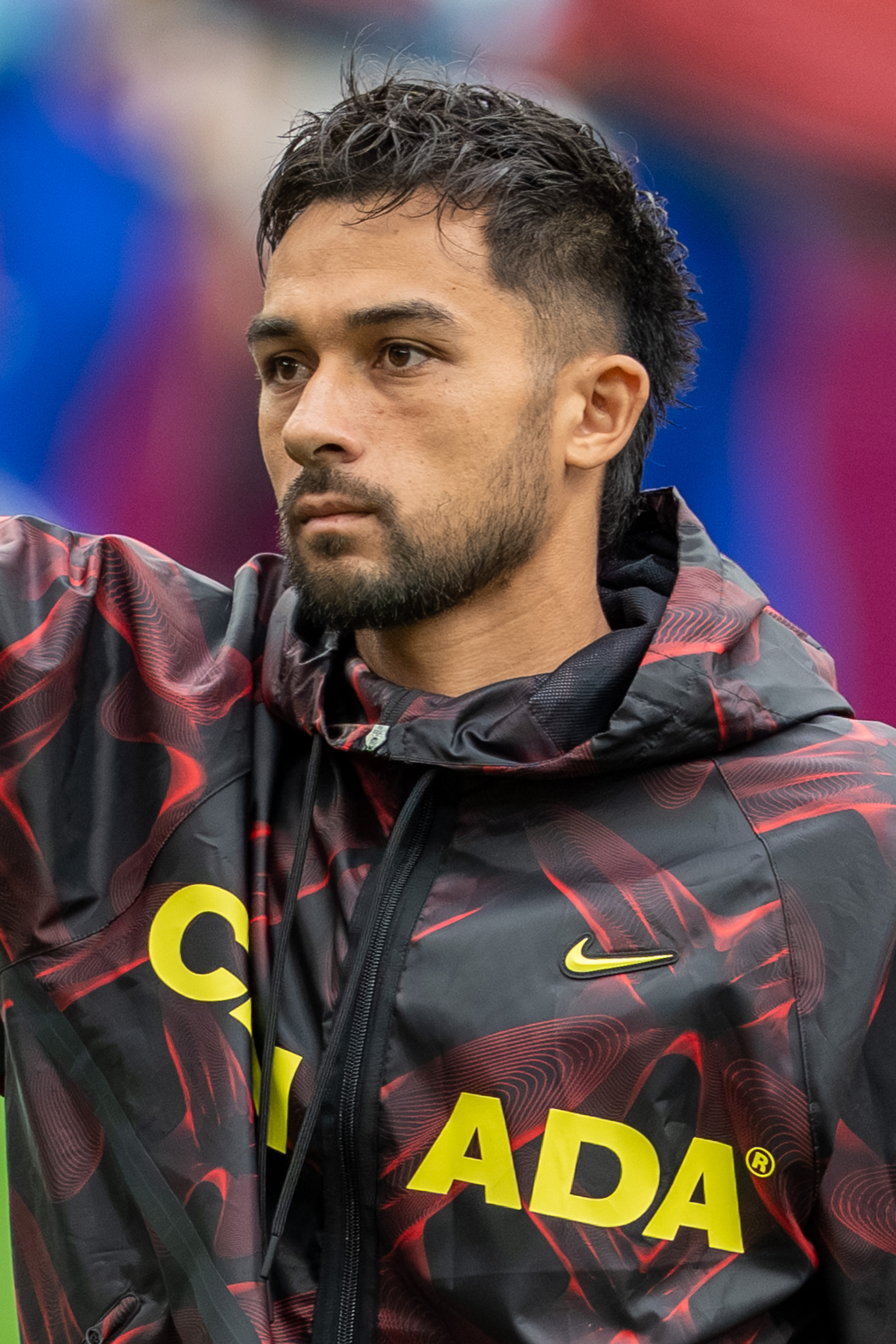
- Choinière with Canada in 2026

Personal information
- Date of birth: February 7, 1999 (age 27)
- Place of birth: Saint-Jean-sur-Richelieu, Quebec, Canada
- Height: 1.75 m (5 ft 9 in)
- Positions: Midfielder; right winger

Team information
- Current team: Los Angeles FC
- Number: 66

Youth career
- Celtix du Haut-Richelieu
- CS St-Hubert
- 2011–2018: Montreal Impact

Senior career*
Years	Team	Apps	(Gls)
2018–2024	CF Montréal (Note: Montreal Impact changed its name to CF Montréal in 2021)	119	(11)
2024–2025	Grasshopper	17	(1)
2025	→ Los Angeles FC (loan)	10	(1)
2026–	Los Angeles FC	33	(2)

International career^{‡}
2018	Canada U20	5	(1)
2018	Canada U21	4	(1)
2023–	Canada	29	(0)
2026	Canada B	1	(0)
- * Club domestic league appearances and goals as of November 7, 2026 ‡ National team caps and goals as of November 16, 2026

Mathieu Choinière (born February 7, 1999) is a Canadian professional soccer player who plays as a central midfielder, defensive midfielder or right winger for Major League Soccer club Los Angeles FC and the Canada national team.

== Early life ==
Choinière was born in Saint-Jean-sur-Richelieu, Quebec and grew up in the neighbouring Saint-Alexandre, Quebec. He began playing soccer with Celtix du Haut-Richelieu, before moving on to CS St-Hubert. In 2011, he joined the Montreal Impact Academy and became the first player in the organization's history to play for the U13, U14, U16, U18 and U19 teams prior to joining the first team.

== Club career ==
Mathieu Choiniere with Los Angeles FC in 2026

=== CF Montréal ===
Choinière signed an MLS contract with the Montreal Impact, later renamed CF Montréal, on July 17, 2018. He made his first appearance the next day against the Vancouver Whitecaps FC in the Canadian Championship. He made his first league appearance 3 days later against the Portland Timbers. Choinière would have his option for the 2020 season exercised by the Impact, keeping him with the club. In February 2022 Choinière signed a contract extension through 2024, with an option year for 2025. In June 2023, he was named to the 2023 MLS All-Star Game team after a standout first half of the season. During the 2024 season, Choinière was once again named an MLS All-Star.

=== Grasshoppers ===
On August 27, 2024, Choinière made the jump into European football, signing a three-year contract with Swiss Super League side Grasshoppers. He made his debut for his new club on September 21, 2024, against Servette, and scored the first goal in an eventual 2–2 draw.

=== Los Angeles FC ===
On July 28, 2025, he was loaned to Grasshoppers' parent club Los Angeles FC until the end of 2025. On December 9, 2025, LAFC exercised their buy option to sign Choinière permanently.

== International career ==
=== Youth ===
Choinière has been called up to various youth camps for Canada. In 2017, he was called up to a Quebec-Canada U20 team to play friendlies against Haiti U20, who were preparing for the 2017 Jeux de la Francophonie. In May 2018, he was called up to the Canada U21 team for the 2018 Toulon Tournament. He scored a goal against France in the fifth-place playoff. In October 2018 Choinière was named to the Canadian Under-20 squad for the 2018 CONCACAF U-20 Championship. He scored in Canada's second game of the tournament against Guadeloupe. Choinière was named to the Canadian U-23 provisional roster for the 2020 CONCACAF Men's Olympic Qualifying Championship on February 26, 2020.

=== Senior ===
In November 2022, Choinière received his first call-up to the Canadian senior side for a friendly against Bahrain, but did not feature in the match. On October 13, 2023, Choinière made his debut for Canada in a friendly against Japan, coming on as a substitute for Jonathan Osorio at the 61st minute.

In June 2024, Choinière was named to Canada's 26-man squad for the 2024 Copa América.

In May 2026, Choinière was selected for Canada's squad for the 2026 FIFA World Cup.

== Personal life ==
Choinière is of Filipino descent. His older brother David is also a soccer player.

== Career statistics ==
=== Club ===
As of match played November 7, 2026

Appearances and goals by club, season and competition
Club	Season	League			Playoffs		National cup		Continental		Other		Total	
Club	Season	Division	Apps	Goals	Apps	Goals	Apps	Goals	Apps	Goals	Apps	Goals	Apps	Goals
Montreal Impact	2018	Major League Soccer	5	0	—		1	0	—		—		6	0
Montreal Impact	2019	Major League Soccer	17	0	—		2	0	—		—		19	0
Montreal Impact	2020	Major League Soccer	0	0	0	0	—		0	0	—		0	0
CF Montréal	2021	Major League Soccer	26	2	—		1	0	—		—		27	2
CF Montréal	2022	Major League Soccer	26	2	1	0	2	0	2	0	—		31	2
CF Montréal	2023	Major League Soccer	28	5	—		4	0	—		2	1	34	6
CF Montréal	2024	Major League Soccer	17	2	0	0	2	0	—		3	0	22	2
CF Montréal	Total		119	11	1	0	12	0	2	0	5	1	139	12
Grasshopper	2024–25	Swiss Super League	17	1	—		0	0	—		1	0	18	1
Los Angeles FC (loan)	2025	Major League Soccer	10	1	2	0	—		—		1	0	13	1
Los Angeles FC	2026	Major League Soccer	33	2	0	0	—		8	0	3	0	44	2
Los Angeles FC	LAFC total		43	3	2	0	—		8	0	4	0	57	3
Career total			179	15	3	0	12	0	10	0	10	1	214	16

=== International ===
As of match played November 16, 2026

Appearances and goals by national team and year
National team	Year	Apps	Goals
Canada	2023	1	0
Canada	2024	9	0
Canada	2025	11	0
Canada	2026	8	0
Total		29	0

== Honours ==
Montreal Impact

- Canadian Championship: 2019, 2021

Individual

- MLS All-Star: 2023, 2024
- CONCACAF Champions Cup Best XI: 2026
