= Gabriele Corbo =

Italian footballer (born 2000)

Personal information
- Date of birth: 11 January 2000 (age 26)
- Place of birth: Naples, Italy
- Height: 1.86 m (6 ft 1 in)
- Position: Defender

Team information
- Current team: Campobasso
- Number: 95

Youth career
- –2018: Spezia

Senior career*
Years	Team	Apps	(Gls)
2017–2018	Spezia	1	(0)
2018–2023	Bologna	3	(0)
2020–2021	→ Ascoli (loan)	14	(0)
2022	→ CF Montréal (loan)	14	(0)
2023–2024	CF Montréal	56	(0)
2025	Córdoba	3	(0)
2025–2026	Pescara	16	(0)
2026–	Campobasso	2	(0)

International career^{‡}
2016–2017	Italy U-17	3	(0)
2017–2018	Italy U-18	12	(0)
2018–2019	Italy U-19	10	(1)
2019	Italy U-20	1	(0)
- * Club domestic league appearances and goals as of 29 August 2026 ‡ National team caps and goals as of 25 September 2022

Gabriele Corbo (born 11 January 2000) is an Italian professional footballer who plays as a defender for Serie C Group B club Campobasso.

== Club career ==
Corbo made his Serie B debut for Spezia against Avellino on 11 May 2018.

Corbo signed for Bologna from Spezia in the summer of 2018 in a reported €2.2 million deal.

On 19 September 2020 he went to Ascoli on loan.

On 5 December 2021, it was announced Corbo would join MLS side CF Montréal on loan for their 2022 season. On 20 March 2023, Corbo returned to Montréal on a permanent basis on a two-year contract, with an option for the third year.

On 31 January 2025, Corbo was announced at Segunda División side Córdoba. On 2 June, after just three matches, the club announced his departure.

On 17 July 2025, Corbo moved to Pescara in Serie B.

== International career ==
Corbo has represented Italy at U17, U18 and U20 level.

== Personal life ==
Corbo is a native of Naples.

== Career statistics ==
As of match played 23 October 2024

Appearances and goals by club, season and competition
Club	Season	League			National cup (Note: Includes Coppa Italia, Canadian Championship)		Continental		Other		Total	
Club	Season	Division	Apps	Goals	Apps	Goals	Apps	Goals	Goals	Apps	Goals	Apps
Spezia	2017-18	Serie B	1	0	0	0	—		—		1	0
Bologna	2018-19	Serie A	1	0	0	0	—		—		1	0
Bologna	2019-20	Serie A	2	0	1	0	—		—		3	0
Bologna	2021-22	Serie A	0	0	0	0	—		—		0	0
Bologna	Total		3	0	1	0	—		—		4	0
Ascoli (loan)	2020-21	Serie B	14	0	1	0	—		—		15	0
CF Montréal (loan)	2022	MLS	14	0	2	0	1 (Note: Appearance(s) in CONCACAF Champions Cup)	0	0	0	17	0
CF Montréal	2023	MLS	28	0	4	0	2 (Note: Appearance(s) in Leagues Cup)	0	—		34	0
CF Montréal	2024	MLS	28	0	1	0	3	0	1 (Note: Appearance(s) in MLS Cup playoffs)	0	33	0
CF Montréal	Total		56	0	5	0	5	0	1	0	67	0
Career total			88	0	9	0	6	0	1	0	104	0
