= Geodis Park =

Soccer stadium in Nashville, Tennessee

- The Castle

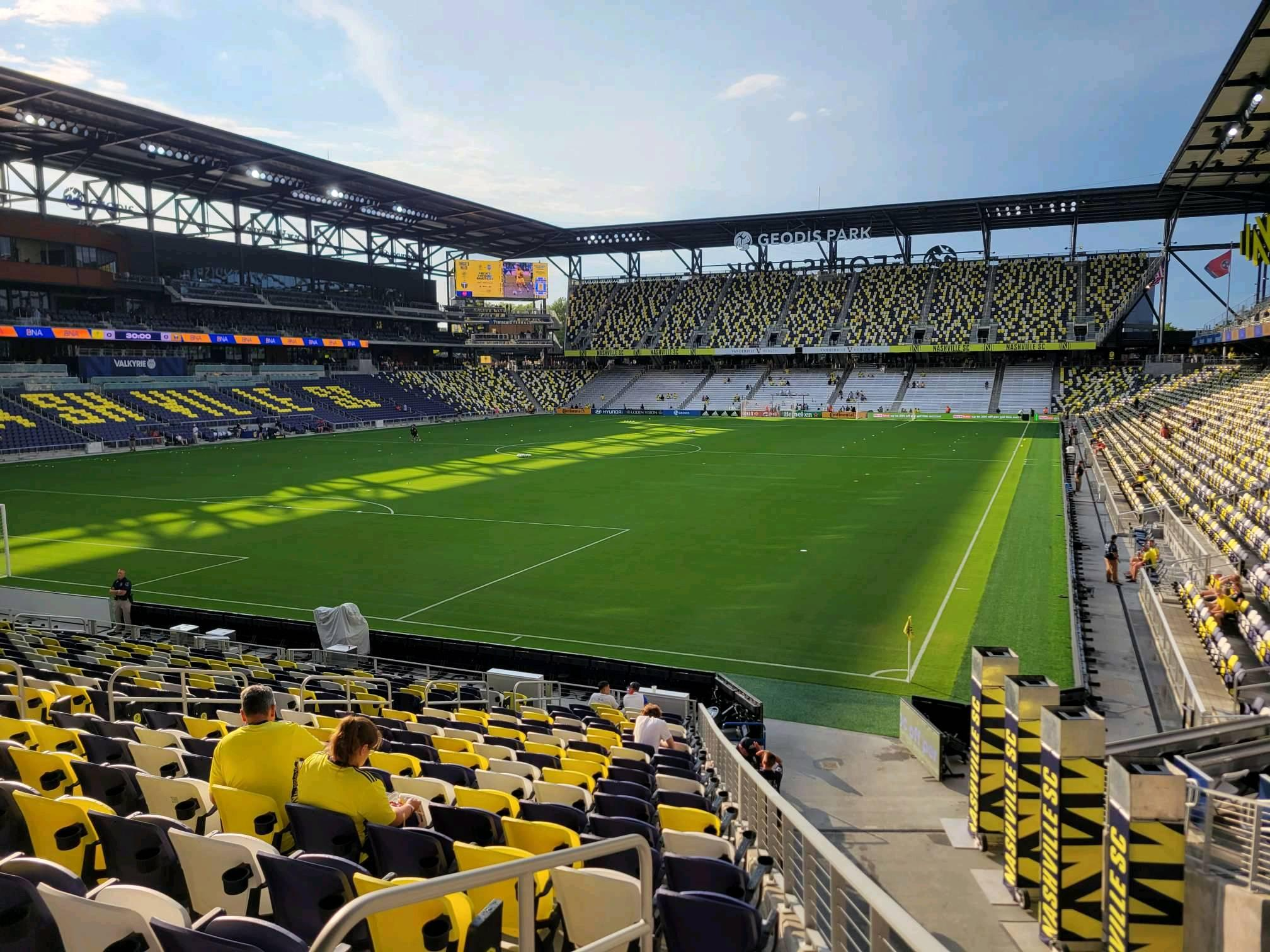
- Geodis Park in 2022

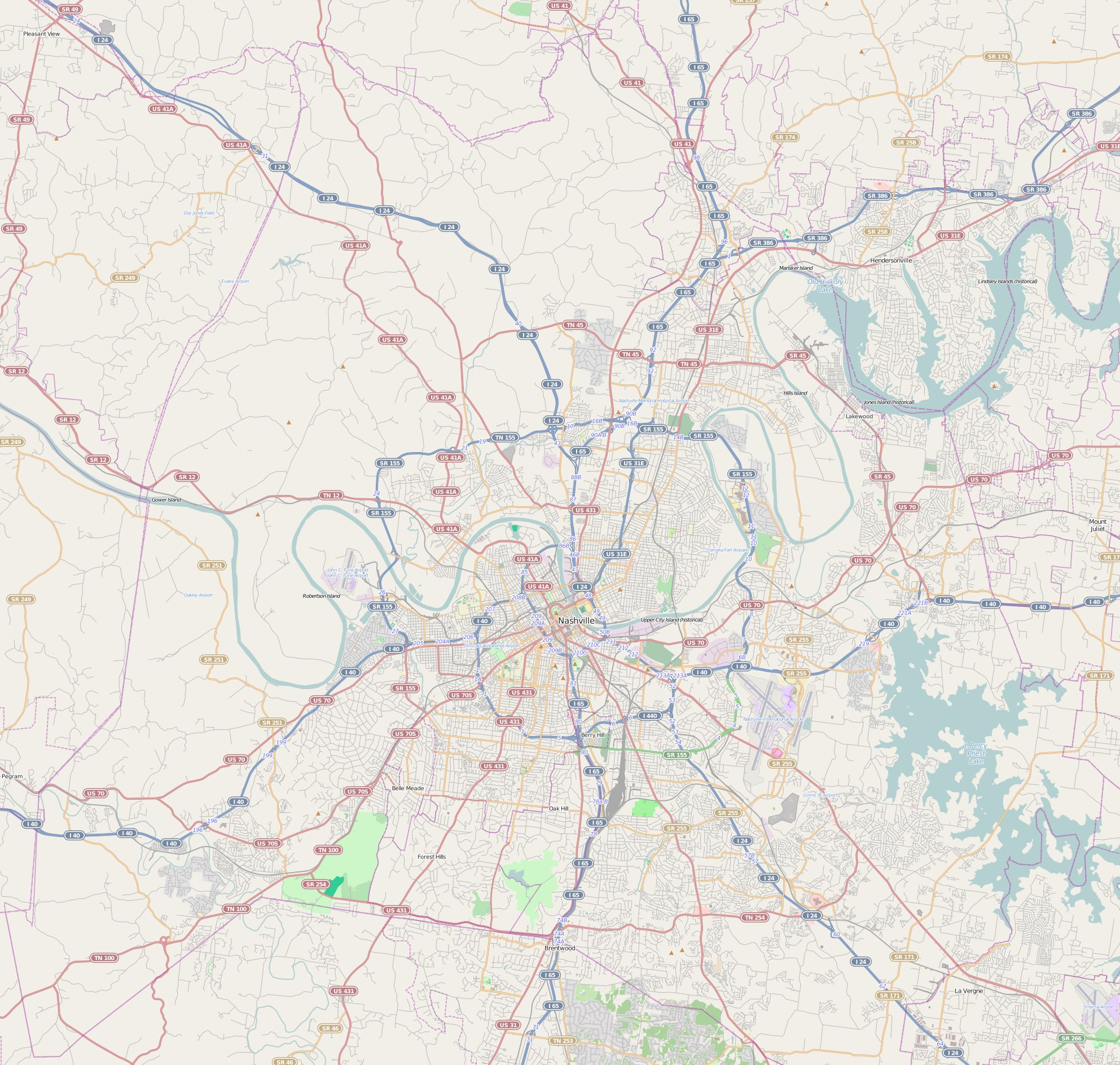
- Location in Nashville Location in Tennessee Location in the United States
- Former names: Nashville Fairgrounds Stadium (working title); Nashville SC Stadium (placeholder name)
- Address: 501 Benton Ave
- Location: Nashville, Tennessee, U.S.
- Coordinates: 36°07′48.3″N 86°45′57.6″W
- Owner: Metro Nashville
- Operator: Nashville SC
- Capacity: 30,109
- Type: Soccer-specific stadium
- Surface: Grass

Construction
- Groundbreaking: July 22, 2020
- Opened: May 1, 2022
- Architect: Populous
- Structural engineer: Walter P Moore
- General contractor: Mortenson Messer

Tenant
- Nashville SC (MLS) (2022–present)

Website
- geodispark.com

Geodis Park, known during development and construction as Nashville SC Stadium and Nashville Fairgrounds Stadium, is a 30,109-seat soccer-specific stadium at the historic Nashville Fairgrounds in Nashville, Tennessee, United States. It is the home of Major League Soccer club Nashville SC. The stadium opened on May 1, 2022, with Nashville SC hosting the Philadelphia Union in the stadium's inaugural match. The stadium was one of twelve venues to host the 2025 FIFA Club World Cup.

== Construction ==
In December 2016, the construction was expected to cost $275 million. Billionaire businessman John Ingram was expected to pay "$25 million up front and $9 million a year over 30 years to help retire Metro's annual $13 million debt for the $225 bond issuance." Additionally, the Nashville Fairgrounds would be renovated for an additional $40 million.

As part of the public-private partnership, Mayor Megan Barry vowed to give "10 acres of city-owned fairgrounds land for a mix-use development next to the stadium" to the developers, including Ingram.

The Metropolitan Council of Nashville and Davidson County approved $25 million in 2018, and an additional $5 million was approved directly by Mayor David Briley's office "from a 2017 contingency fund" without the council's approval in February 2019, for a total of $37.6 million.

The stadium is part of a re-development project at the fairgrounds site that also includes a relocated Expo event space, new mixed-use retail and residential buildings and an upgraded Nashville Fairgrounds Speedway capable of hosting NASCAR Cup Series events.

By February 2019, its construction had been delayed and its budget had increased. The original builder, Ely Concrete, abandoned the project and they were replaced by TRC Construction Services. By August 2019, the construction was expected to cost "between $325 million and $345 million", or "between $50 million and $70 million more than initial estimates," to be covered by billionaire Ingram and other investors, not taxpayers.

As of July 2019, an exposition center was under construction for the State Fair. By August 23, the fair was expected to be held on September 6–15 "in the old fairgrounds space."

A resolution to stop the demolition of buildings and make way for the stadium was introduced by council member Steve Glover on August 2, but it was voted down on August 21.

Nashville SC was originally supposed to start playing in the stadium in 2020, but by 2019 it had been delayed to 2022.

=== Revised stadium deal and construction ===
On February 13, 2020, the agreements of the stadium deal were amended in order to allow for construction to begin on the site. This amended deal, an agreement reached by Nashville mayor John Cooper and the club's lead owner, John R. Ingram, stated that the team would fund 100 percent of the stadium's construction costs on the Fairgrounds site. This would be accomplished through lease payments on the stadium, cash investments, and revenue collected from the attendees of events at the stadium. In addition to the aforementioned agreement from the team, Nashville SC also committed to paying for the infrastructure in the immediate area around the stadium, estimated to cost $19 million. The team will pay $35 million in lease payments. Altogether, the team agreed to a total of $54 million in additional payments.

In addition to the aforementioned monetary agreements of the deal, the team and the city came to an agreement on the parcel of land titled 8C which is about 2.4 acres in size and located between the stadium and the Fairgrounds Speedway. This parcel of land is what prohibited a deal from being reached prior to February 13, 2020. Mayor Cooper wanted the team to give up this piece of land and in a response to a letter from John Ingram, Cooper described parcel 8C saying, "The public space that links two 30,000-seat stadiums has the potential to become one of the most important in Nashville. Careful design and execution is essential to make the site work for two large public venues—supporting circulation, security, staging and access." Ultimately, the deal reached between the city and the team on February 13 stated that the piece of land would be made into a mixed-use open plaza that will allow space for future Fairgrounds and Speedway activities and uses.

On March 16, 2020, demolition on the fairgrounds site began. On April 9, 2020, Ian Ayre published an open letter to fans stating that the demolition on the site is “progressing steadily and in a timely fashion." Ayre also stated that team had completed construction documents and that the expected completion date for the stadium is mid-May 2022.

On March 10, 2022, a long-term sponsorship deal with Geodis, whose North American headquarters are based in nearby Brentwood, was announced, renaming the stadium to Geodis Park.

== Lawsuits ==
In November 2017, Metro Nashville was sued by a group called Save Our Fairgrounds on the basis that the construction could disrupt the Tennessee State Fair, the Nashville Flea Market, and Fairgrounds Speedway racing activities. The lawsuit was dismissed by Chancellor Ellen Hobbs Lyle in December 2017. The dismissal was overturned by the Tennessee Court of Appeals in July 2019 to address the duties of the Fair Board and their ability to collect taxes on fairground activities.

In January 2019, a second lawsuit was filed by Tennessee State Fair Association (TSFA), chaired by U.S. Representative John Rose, against the Metropolitan Government of Nashville and Davidson County. According to The Tennessean, the suit contended that the construction of the stadium failed to "leave sufficient space and structures for the state fair, which is a protected use in the Metro Charter." The suit was dismissed by the same judge, Ellen Hobbs Lyle, a few days later. The TSFA planned to take the case to the Tennessee Supreme Court, but on February 19, 2019, they decided to settle out of court and hope for a meeting with the Metropolitan Council.

== Design ==
The stadium was designed by Populous, a firm in Kansas City that had also designed venues for other MLS clubs. The facility seats 30,000 people, making it the largest soccer-specific stadium in the United States or Canada. It includes six lounges, two dozen box suites, and a dedicated entry gate for the supporters group located on the north side.

== Transportation ==
Geodis Park has 11 official parking lots around the Fairgrounds used for Nashville SC matches, which require a pre-paid pass. Several lots are paved, while others have gravel and grass surfaces; the stadium also has a ride-hailing lot. The WeGo Public Transit system has two bus stops near Geodis Park but does not run special late night services for matches.

== International matches ==
=== 2025 FIFA Club World Cup ===
Date	Team 1	Score	Team 2	Round	Spectators
June 20, 2025	(United States) Los Angeles FC	0–1	(Tunisia) Espérance de Tunis	Group D	13,651
June 24, 2025	(New Zealand) Auckland City	1–1	(Argentina) Boca Juniors	Group C	16,899
June 26, 2025	(Saudi Arabia) Al-Hilal	2–0	(Mexico) C.F. Pachuca	Group H	14,147

=== 2028 Summer Olympics ===
Geodis Park is one of six venues outside of Los Angeles which will host Olympic soccer matches at the 2028 Summer Olympics. A total of nine matches will be played at Geodis Park.

=== Men's matches ===
Date	Team 1	Score	Team 2	Tournament	Spectators
October 17, 2023	United States	4–0	Ghana	Friendly	18,468
June 10, 2025	United States	0–4	Switzerland	Friendly	20,602
September 9, 2025	Mexico	2–2	South Korea	Friendly	27,604

=== Women's matches ===
Date	Team 1	Score	Team 2	Tournament	Spectators
February 19, 2023	United States	1–0	Japan	2023 SheBelieves Cup	25,471
February 19, 2023	Canada	2–0	Brazil	2023 SheBelieves Cup	6,502
October 27, 2024	United States	3–1	Iceland	Friendly	17,018
March 1, 2026	Canada	4–1	Colombia	2026 SheBelieves Cup	17,125
March 1, 2026	United States	2–0	Argentina	2026 SheBelieves Cup	17,125

=== Club friendlies ===
Date	Team 1	Score	Team 2	Tournament	Spectators
July 25, 2026	(England) Liverpool	4–2	(England) Sunderland	Friendly	24,897

== Concerts and events ==
Geodis Park also serves as a major concert venue.

Date	Artist	Opening Act(s)	Tour / Concert Name	Attendance	Revenue	Notes
June 7, 2023	Shania Twain	Kelsea Ballerini; Breland	Queen of Me Tour	27,707 / 27,707	$3,606,876	First concert to be held at the stadium.
August 26, 2023	Guns N' Roses	Carrie Underwood	Guns N' Roses 2023 Tour	23,594 / 23,594	$3,484,912	-
September 22, 2023	P!nk	Brandi Carlile; Grouplove; KidCutUp	Summer Carnival	28,382 / 28,382	$5,906,419	-
August 30, 2024	Green Day	The Smashing Pumpkins; Rancid; The Linda Lindas	The Saviors Tour	TBA	TBA	-
October 10, 2025	Tyler Childers	Charley Crockett; Cory Branan	Tyler Childers: On The Road	TBA	TBA	-
October 11, 2025	Tyler Childers	Charley Crockett; Cory Branan	Tyler Childers: On The Road	TBA	TBA	-
