= LA Galaxy in international soccer competitions =

List of soccer competitions

LA Galaxy in North American soccer
- Club: LA Galaxy
- First entry: 1997 CONCACAF Champions' Cup
- Latest entry: 2026 CONCACAF Champions Cup

Titles
- Copa Interamericana: 0
- Champions League: 1: 2000
- SuperLiga: 0
- FIFA Club World Cup: 0

This is a list of LA Galaxy's matches in international soccer competitions. The LA Galaxy have participated in numerous international tournaments, both competitive and non-competitive. Their most successful international club title came in 2000, when the Galaxy won the CONCACAF Champions' Cup.

== FIFA Club World Cup ==
Season	Round	Opponent	Score
2001	Group C	(Ghana) Hearts of Oak	Canceled
2001	Group C	(Spain) Real Madrid	Canceled
2001	Group C	(Japan) Júbilo Iwata	Canceled

== CONCACAF Champions Cup ==
The competition was known as the CONCACAF Champions League from 2008–2022.

Season	Round	Opponent	Home	Away	Aggregate
1997	First round	(Mexico) Santos Laguna	4–1	—N/a	4–1
1997	Quarterfinals	(El Salvador) Firpo	2–0	—N/a	2–0
1997	Semifinals	(United States) D.C. United	1–0	—N/a	1–0
1997	Final	(Mexico) Cruz Azul	3–5	—N/a	3–5
1999	First round	(Mexico) Necaxa	1–1	—N/a	1–1 (Note: Necaxa won 4–3 on penalties.)
2000	Quarterfinals	(Honduras) Real España	0–0	—N/a	0–0 (Note: LA Galaxy won 5–3 on penalties.)
2000	Semifinals	(United States) D.C. United	1–1	—N/a	1–1 (Note: LA Galaxy won 4–2 on penalties.)
2000	Final	(Honduras) Olimpia	3–2	—N/a	3–2
2003	First round	(Honduras) Motagua	1–0	2–2	3–2
2003	Quarterfinals	(Mexico) Necaxa	1–2	1–4	2–6
2006	Quarterfinals	(Costa Rica) Saprissa	0–0	2–3	2–3
2010–11	Preliminary round	Puerto Rico Islanders	1–4	2–1	3–5
2011–12	Group A	(Mexico) Morelia	2–1	1–2	1st
2011–12	Group A	(Costa Rica) Alajuelense	2–0	0–1	1st
2011–12	Group A	(Honduras) Motagua	2–0	1–0	1st
2011–12	Quarterfinals	(Canada) Toronto FC	1–2	2–2	3–4
2012–13	Group H	(El Salvador) Metapán	5–2	3–2	1st
2012–13	Group H	Puerto Rico Islanders	4–0	0–0	1st
2012–13	Quarterfinals	(Costa Rica) Herediano	4–1	0–0	4–1
2012–13	Semifinals	(Mexico) Monterrey	1–2	0–1	1–3
2013–14	Group H	(El Salvador) Metapán	1–0	0–4	1st
2013–14	Group H	(Costa Rica) Cartaginés	2–0	3–0	1st
2013–14	Quarterfinals	(Mexico) Tijuana	1–0	2–4	3–4
2015–16	Group D	(Trinidad and Tobago) Central	5–1	1–1	1st
2015–16	Group D	(Guatemala) Comunicaciones	5–0	1–1	1st
2015–16	Quarterfinals	(Mexico) Santos Laguna	0–0	0–4	0–4
2025	Round of 16	(Costa Rica) Herediano	4–1	0–1	4–2
2025	Quarterfinals	(Mexico) Tigres UANL	0–0	2–3	2–3
2026	First round	(Panama) Sporting San Miguelito	0–0	1–1	1–1 (Note: LA Galaxy won on away goals.)
2026	Round of 16	(Jamaica) Mount Pleasant	3–0	3–0	6–0
2026	Quarterfinals	(Mexico) Toluca	0–3	2–4	2–7

== North American SuperLiga ==
Season	Round	Opponent	Home	Away	Aggregate
2007	Group A	(Mexico) Pachuca	2–1	—N/a	1st
2007	Group A	(Mexico) Guadalajara	1–2	—N/a	1st
2007	Group A	(United States) FC Dallas	—N/a	6–5	1st
2007	Semifinals	(United States) D.C. United	2–0	—N/a	2–0
2007	Final	(Mexico) Pachuca	1–1	—N/a	1–1 (Note: Pachuca won 4–3 on penalties.)

== Leagues Cup ==
Season	Round	Opponent	Score
2019	Quarterfinals	(Mexico) Tijuana	2–2 (Note: LA Galaxy won 3–1 on penalties.)
2019	Semifinals	(Mexico) Cruz Azul	1–2
2023	Group stage	(Mexico) León	0–1
2023	Group stage	(Canada) Vancouver Whitecaps FC	1–2
2024	Group stage	(United States) San Jose Earthquakes	2–1
2024	Group stage	(Mexico) Guadalajara	2–2 (Note: LA Galaxy won 5–4 on penalties.)
2024	Round of 32	(United States) Seattle Sounders FC	1–3
2025	League phase	(Mexico) Tijuana	5–2
2025	League phase	(Mexico) Cruz Azul	1–1 (Note: Cruz Azul won 8–7 on penalties.)
2025	League phase	(Mexico) Santos Laguna	4–0
2025	Quarterfinals	(Mexico) Pachuca	2–1
2025	Semifinals	(United States) Seattle Sounders FC	0–2
2025	Third place playoff	(United States) Orlando City SC	2–1

== Friendly tournaments ==
=== International Champions Cup ===
Season	Round	Opponent	Score	Aggregate
2013	Group B	(Spain) Real Madrid	1–3	2nd
2013	Group B	(Italy) Juventus	3–1	2nd
2013	Consolation match	(Italy) Milan	0–2	0–2

=== La Manga Cup ===
Season	Round	Opponent	Score	Aggregate
2003	Group B	(Norway) Lyn	5–0	2nd
2003	Group B	(Russia) Torpedo Moscow	3–1	2nd
2003	Group B	(Norway) Odd	0–1	2nd
2003	Consolation match	(Norway) Viking	3–0	3–0

=== Pan-Pacific Championship ===
Season	Round	Opponent	Score
2008	Semifinals	(Japan) Gamba Osaka	0–1
2008	Consolation match	(Australia) Sydney FC	2–1
2009	Semifinals	(Japan) Ōita Trinita	2–0
2009	Final	(South Korea) Suwon Bluewings	1–1 (Note: Suwon Bluewings won 4–2 on penalties.)

=== Peace Cup ===
Season	Round	Opponent	Score	Aggregate
2003	Group B	(Uruguay) Nacional	0–0	4th
2003	Group B	(Germany) 1860 Munich	0–0	4th
2003	Group B	(Netherlands) PSV Eindhoven	1–4	4th

=== World Football Challenge ===
Season	Round	Opponent	Score
2011	Group stage	(Spain) Real Madrid	1–4
2011	Group stage	(England) Manchester City	1–1 (Note: Manchester City won 7–6 on penalties.)
2012	Group stage	(Spain) Real Madrid	1–5

== Overall record ==
Competition	Played	Won	Drew	Lost	GF	GA	GD	Win% (Note: Win% is rounded to two decimal places.)
CONCACAF Cup/Champions League	46	20	13	13	73	58	+15	43.48
SuperLiga	5	3	1	1	13	9	+4	60.00
Friendly tournaments	17	6	4	7	22	25	−3	35.29
Club World Cup	0	0	0	0	0	0	+0	—
Total	68	29	18	21	108	92	+16	42.65

Legend: GF = Goals For. GA = Goals Against. GD = Goal Difference.
