= List of Inter Miami CF records and statistics =

Inter Miami CF is an American professional soccer team based in Miami, that competes in Major League Soccer.

This is a list of club records for Miami, which dates from their inaugural season in 2020 to present.

== Player records ==
- MLS = Major League Soccer
- PO = MLS Cup playoffs
- OC = U.S. Open Cup
- LC = Leagues Cup
- CCC = CONCACAF Champions Cup
- CWC = FIFA Club World Cup
- CC = Campeones Cup
- – = Player did not appear in this competition.

Current players on the Miami roster and records in each competition are shown in bold.

As of November 22, 2026

=== Most appearances ===
Rk	Player	Nat.	Period	MLS	PO	OC	LC	CCC	CWC	CC	Total
1	Noah Allen	(Greece)	2022–2026	90	8	4	14	**13**	**4**	–	133
2	**Lionel Messi**	(Argentina)	2023–	84	**10**	1	13	12	**4**	**1**	125
3	**Luis Suárez**	(Uruguay)	2024–	85	8	–	9	**13**	**4**	**1**	120
4	Drake Callender	(United States)	2020–2025	**92**	4	8	10	4	–	–	118
5	Sergio Busquets	(Spain)	2023–2025	74	8	2	**17**	11	**4**	–	116
5	Robert Taylor	(Finland)	2022–2025	91	2	**9**	9	5	–	–	116
7	Benjamin Cremaschi	(United States)	2023–2025	72	3	6	14	8	**4**	–	107
8	**Yannick Bright**	(Italy)	2024–	76	8	–	12	8	–	**1**	105
9	Jordi Alba	(Spain)	2023–2025	65	9	1	15	10	3	–	103
10	Leonardo Campana	(Ecuador)	2022–2024	80	2	6	11	1	–	–	100

=== Top goalscorers ===
Rk	Player	Nat.	Period	MLS	PO	OC	LC	CCC	CWC	CC	Total (Note: Numbers in brackets indicate appearances made.)	Ø
1	**Lionel Messi**	(Argentina)	2023–	**76**	7	0	**14**	**8**	**1**	**1**	**107** (125)	0.86
2	**Luis Suárez**	(Uruguay)	2024–	47	1	–	5	5	**1**	0	**59** (120)	0.49
3	Leonardo Campana	(Ecuador)	2022–2024	28	0	**3**	1	0	–	–	**32** (100)	0.32
4	Gonzalo Higuaín	(Argentina)	2020–2022	29	0	0	–	–	–	–	**29** (70)	0.41
5	**Tadeo Allende**	(Argentina)	2025–	11	**9**	–	1	2	**1**	–	**24** (65)	0.37
6	Robert Taylor	(Finland)	2022–2025	13	0	0	4	1	–	–	**18** (116)	0.16
7	**Telasco Segovia**	(Venezuela)	2025–	11	1	–	4	0	**1**	–	**17** (91)	0.19
8	Jordi Alba	(Spain)	2023–2025	11	1	0	2	1	0	–	**15** (103)	0.15
9	Josef Martínez	(Venezuela)	2023	7	–	2	3	–	–	–	**12** (40)	0.30
10	**Germán Berterame**	(Mexico)	2026–	10	0	–	–	0	–	0	**10** (34)	0.29

=== Top assisters ===
Rk	Player	Nat.	Period	MLS	PO	OC	LC	CCC	CWC	CC	Total	Ø
1	**Lionel Messi**	(Argentina)	2023–	**41**	**8**	2	4	2	0	**1**	**58** (125)	0.46
2	**Luis Suárez**	(Uruguay)	2024–	26	1	–	4	**4**	**1**	**1**	**37** (120)	0.31
3	Jordi Alba	(Spain)	2023–2025	21	3	0	**8**	1	0	–	**33** (103)	0.32
4	Robert Taylor	(Finland)	2022–2025	11	0	**3**	4	0	–	–	**18** (116)	0.16
5	**Rodrigo De Paul**	(Argentina)	2025–	13	1	–	2	0	–	0	**16** (59)	0.27
5	Sergio Busquets	(Spain)	2023–2025	13	0	0	0	3	0	–	**16** (116)	0.14
7	**Telasco Segovia**	(Venezuela)	2025–	14	0	–	0	0	0	–	**14** (91)	0.15
8	Gonzalo Higuaín	(Argentina)	2020–2022	12	0	0	–	–	–	–	**12** (70)	0.17
9	Julian Gressel	(United States)	2024–2025	9	–	–	0	1	–	–	**10** (40)	0.25
10	Rodolfo Pizarro	(Mexico)	2020–2023	9	0	0	–	–	–	–	**9** (62)	0.15
10	Benjamin Cremaschi	(United States)	2023–2025	7	0	1	1	0	0	–	**9** (107)	0.08
10	Noah Allen	(Greece)	2022–2026	4	0	0	3	1	**1**	–	**9** (133)	0.07

=== Most clean sheets ===
Rk	Player	Nat.	Period	MLS	PO	OC	LC	CCC	CWC	CC	Total	Ø
1	Drake Callender	(United States)	2020–2025	**14**	0	**2**	**2**	0	–	–	**18** (118)	0.15
2	Oscar Ustari	(Argentina)	2024–2025	4	–	–	0	**3**	**1**	–	**8** (41)	0.20
3	Nick Marsman	(Netherlands)	2021–2023	6	–	1	–	–	–	–	**7** (30)	0.23
4	**Rocco Ríos Novo**	(Argentina)	2025–	4	**2**	–	0	–	–	–	**6** (28)	0.21
4	**Dayne St. Clair**	(Canada)	2026–	4	0	–	–	1	–	**1**	**6** (32)	0.19
6	John McCarthy	(United States)	2020–2021	3	0	–	–	–	–	–	**3** (22)	0.14
7	Luis Robles	(United States)	2020	2	–	–	–	–	–	–	**2** (15)	0.13
8	Clément Diop	(Senegal)	2022	1	–	–	–	–	–	–	**1** (3)	0.33
8	CJ dos Santos	(United States)	2022–2024	0	–	–	1	–	–	–	**1** (3)	0.33

=== Other records ===
- Youngest player: Edison Azcona – 17 years, 162 days (May 2, 2021 - MLS)
- Oldest player: **Luis Suárez** – 39 years, 301 days (November 21, 2026 - MLS PO)
- Youngest goalscorer: Benjamin Cremaschi – 18 years, 128 days (July 8, 2023 - MLS)
- Oldest goalscorer: **Luis Suárez** – 39 years, 287 days (November 7, 2026 - MLS)
- Most goals in all competitions in a season: 43* – **Lionel Messi** (2025)
- Most goals in MLS in a regular season: 29 – **Lionel Messi** (2025)
- Most goals in MLS playoffs in a season: 9* – **Tadeo Allende** (2025)
- Most goals in a single match: 4 – **Lionel Messi** (August 29, 2026 - MLS)
- Most hat-tricks in all competitions: 3 – **Lionel Messi**
- Most penalty goals in all competitions: 8 – Gonzalo Higuaín
- Most direct free kick goals in all competitions: 12 – **Lionel Messi**
- Most assists in all competitions in a season: 25 – **Lionel Messi** (2025)
- Most assists in MLS in a regular season: 16 – **Lionel Messi** (2025)
- Most assists in MLS playoffs in a season: 7** – **Lionel Messi** (2025)
- Most assists in a single match: 5* – **Lionel Messi** (May 4, 2024 - MLS)
- Most goal contributions (goals + assists) in all competitions in a season: 68** – **Lionel Messi** (2025)
- Most goal contributions in MLS in a regular season: 45** – **Lionel Messi** (2025)
- Most goal contributions in MLS playoffs in a season: 13** – **Lionel Messi** (2025)
- Most goal contributions in a single match: 6 – **Lionel Messi** (May 4, 2024 - MLS)
- Most clean sheets in all competitions in a season: 8 – Drake Callender (2023)
- Most clean sheets in MLS in a regular season: 5 – Nick Marsman (2021), Drake Callender (2023, 2024)
- Most appearances in a season: 56* – Sergio Busquets (2025)
- Most international competition appearances: 32 – Sergio Busquets
- Highest transfer fee paid: $17 million – **Rodrigo De Paul** (2026)
- Highest transfer fee received: $15 million – Diego Gómez (2025)

*MLS record
**MLS record (unofficial as MLS recognizes secondary assists)

=== Milestones ===
100 club appearances, all competitions:

- Drake Callender (July 17, 2024 - MLS v. Toronto)
- Robert Taylor (July 17, 2024 - MLS v. Toronto)
- Leonardo Campana (November 9, 2024 - MLS PO v. Atlanta)
- Benjamin Cremaschi (July 30, 2025 - LC v. Atlas)
- Sergio Busquets (August 27, 2025 - LC v. Orlando)
- Noah Allen (September 24, 2025 - MLS v. NYCFC)
- Jordi Alba (November 8, 2025 - MLS PO v. Nashville)
- **Lionel Messi** (May 2, 2026 - MLS v. Orlando)
- **Luis Suárez** (July 22, 2026 - MLS v. Chicago)
- **Yannick Bright** (September 20, 2026 - MLS v. San Diego)

100 club goals, all competitions:

- **Lionel Messi** (September 16, 2026 - CC v. Cruz Azul)

=== Honors ===
- Ballon d'Or : **Lionel Messi** (2023)
- The Best FIFA Men's Player : **Lionel Messi** (2023)
- Landon Donovan MVP Award : **Lionel Messi** (2024, 2025)
- MLS Golden Boot : **Lionel Messi** (2025, 2026)

== Coaching records ==
As of November 22, 2026

Coach	Nat.	From	To	Record				
Coach	Nat.	From	To	G	W	D	L	Win %
Diego Alonso	(Uruguay)	December 30, 2019	January 7, 2021	24	7	3	14	29.17
Phil Neville	(England)	January 18, 2021	June 1, 2023	90	35	13	42	38.89
Javier Morales (interim)	(Argentina)	June 1, 2023	July 10, 2023	7	1	3	3	14.29
Gerardo Martino	(Argentina)	July 10, 2023	November 22, 2024	67	35	16	16	52.24
Javier Mascherano	(Argentina)	November 26, 2024	April 14, 2026	67	37	16	14	55.22
Guillermo Hoyos (interim)	(Argentina)	April 14, 2026	September 14, 2026	21	10	6	5	47.62
Kily González	(Argentina)	September 15, 2026	present	11	5	3	3	45.45
Total				287	130	60	97	45.30

== Team records ==
=== Honors ===
Competition	Titles	Runners-up
MLS Cup	2025	–
Supporters' Shield	2024	–
Leagues Cup	2023	2025
Campeones Cup	2026	–
U.S. Open Cup	–	2023

=== Records ===
- Record win: 7–1 vs. CF Montréal – MLS (August 29, 2026)
- Record defeat: 1–6 vs. FC Cincinnati – MLS (July 6, 2024)
- Most points in MLS in a regular season: 74 (2024)
- Most wins in all competitions in a season: 34 (2025)
- Most wins in MLS in a regular season: 22 (2024)
- Most goals scored in all competitions in a season: 129 (2025)
- Most goals scored in MLS in a regular season: 81 (2025)
- Most goals scored in MLS regular season + playoffs: 101* (2025)
- Most matches played in all competitions in a season: 58* (2025)

*MLS record

== MLS Cup playoffs results ==
=== By season ===
Year	Pld	W	D	L
2020	1	0	0	1
2022	1	0	0	1
2024	3	1	0	2
2025	6	5	0	1
2026	1	0	0	1
Total	12	6	0	6

=== Matches ===
Season	Round	Opponent	Game 1	Game 2	Game 3
2020	Play-in round	Nashville SC	0–3 (a)		
2022	First round	New York City FC	0–3 (a)		
2024	Round one	Atlanta United	2–1 (h)	1–2 (a)	2–3 (h)
2025	Round one	Nashville SC	3–1 (h)	1–2 (a)	4–0 (h)
2025	Conference semifinals	FC Cincinnati	4–0 (a)		
2025	Conference finals	New York City FC	5–1 (h)		
2025	MLS Cup	Vancouver Whitecaps	3–1 (h)		
2026	Round one	Columbus Crew	0–3 (h)	(a)	(h)

== International results ==
=== By competition ===
Competition	Pld	W	D	L	GF	GA	W%
FIFA Club World Cup	4	1	2	1	4	7	25.00
CONCACAF Champions Cup	14	6	3	5	20	17	42.86
Leagues Cup	20	12	3	5	50	32	60.00
Campeones Cup	1	1	0	0	2	0	100.00
Total	39	20	8	11	76	56	51.28

=== By season ===
Year	Pld	W	D	L
2023	7	5	2	0
2024	8	3	1	4
2025	18	10	3	5
2026	6	2	2	2
Total	39	20	8	11

=== By country ===
Country	Pld	W	D	L
Brazil	1	0	1	0
Canada	3	1	0	2
Egypt	1	0	1	0
France	1	0	0	1
Jamaica	2	2	0	0
Mexico	13	7	1	5
Portugal	1	1	0	0
United States	17	9	5	3
Total	39	20	8	11

=== Matches ===
All results (home and away) list Inter Miami's goal tally first.

Season	Competition	Round	Opponent	Home	Away	Aggr.
2023	Leagues Cup	Group stage	(Mexico) Cruz Azul	2–1		1st
2023	Leagues Cup	Group stage	(United States) Atlanta United	4–0		1st
2023	Leagues Cup	Round of 32	(United States) Orlando City	3–1		
2023	Leagues Cup	Round of 16	(United States) FC Dallas	4–4 (5–3 p)		
2023	Leagues Cup	Quarterfinals	(United States) Charlotte FC	4–0		
2023	Leagues Cup	Semifinals	(United States) Philadelphia Union	4–1		
2023	Leagues Cup	Final	(United States) Nashville SC	1–1 (10–9 p)		
2024	CONCACAF Champions Cup	Round of 16	(United States) Nashville SC	3–1	2–2	5–3
2024	CONCACAF Champions Cup	Quarterfinals	(Mexico) Monterrey	1–2	1–3	2–5
2024	Leagues Cup	Group stage	(Mexico) Puebla	2–0		2nd
2024	Leagues Cup	Group stage	(Mexico) Tigres UANL	1–2		2nd
2024	Leagues Cup	Round of 32	(Canada) Toronto FC	4–3		
2024	Leagues Cup	Round of 16	(United States) Columbus Crew	2–3		
2025	CONCACAF Champions Cup	Round one	(United States) Sporting Kansas City	3–1	1–0	4–1
2025	CONCACAF Champions Cup	Round of 16	(Jamaica) Cavalier	2–0	2–0	4–0
2025	CONCACAF Champions Cup	Quarterfinals	(United States) Los Angeles FC	3–1	0–1	3–2
2025	CONCACAF Champions Cup	Semifinals	(Canada) Vancouver Whitecaps	1–3	0–2	1–5
2025	FIFA Club World Cup	Group A	(Egypt) Al Ahly	0–0		2nd
2025	FIFA Club World Cup	Group A	(Portugal) Porto	2–1		2nd
2025	FIFA Club World Cup	Group A	(Brazil) Palmeiras	2–2		2nd
2025	FIFA Club World Cup	Round of 16	(France) Paris Saint-Germain	0–4		
2025	Leagues Cup	League phase	(Mexico) Atlas	2–1		2nd
2025	Leagues Cup	League phase	(Mexico) Necaxa	2–2 (5–4 p)		2nd
2025	Leagues Cup	League phase	(Mexico) Pumas UNAM	3–1		2nd
2025	Leagues Cup	Quarterfinals	(Mexico) Tigres UANL	2–1		
2025	Leagues Cup	Semifinals	(United States) Orlando City	3–1		
2025	Leagues Cup	Final	(United States) Seattle Sounders	0–3		
2026	CONCACAF Champions Cup	Round of 16	(United States) Nashville SC	1–1	0–0	1–1 (a)
2026	Leagues Cup	League phase	(Mexico) Atlético San Luis	4–2		14th
2026	Leagues Cup	League phase	(Mexico) Monterrey	1–2		14th
2026	Leagues Cup	League phase	(Mexico) León	2–3		14th
2026	Campeones Cup	Final	(Mexico) Cruz Azul	2–0		

== See also ==
- List of Inter Miami CF players
- List of Inter Miami CF seasons
