= List of Inter Miami CF players =

Inter Miami CF is an American soccer club founded in 2018, after the city of Miami was awarded a Major League Soccer (MLS) franchise. Inter Miami CF began playing competitive soccer in the 2020 season. It plays its home games at Chase Stadium, competing in the Eastern Conference of MLS.

== Players ==
- MLS: Major League Soccer regular season games
- Total: all competitive games (MLS, MLS Cup playoffs, U.S. Open Cup, Leagues Cup, CONCACAF Champions Cup)

Players who were contracted to the club but never played a competitive game are not listed. Current players on the Miami roster are shown in bold.

Statistics correct as of November 22, 2026.

=== Outfield players ===
Name	Pos.	Country	Years	MLS		Total		Ref.
Name	Pos.	Country	Years	Games	Goals	Games	Goals	Ref.
**Cesar Abadía-Reda**	DF	USA	2026–	5	0	5	0	
George Acosta	MF	USA	2022	1	0	1	0	
Mo Adams	MF	England	2022	8	0	10	0	
Leo Afonso	FW	Brazil	2024–2025	14	2	18	2	
Juan Agudelo	FW	USA	2020	14	3	15	3	
Jordi Alba	DF	Spain	2023–2025	65	11	103	15	
Noah Allen	DF	USA / Greece (Note: Allen switched his international allegiance from USA (47 MLS, 66 total games, 1 goal) to Greece on March 3, 2025.)	2022–2026	90	2	133	2	
**Tadeo Allende**	FW	Argentina	2025–	40	11	65	24	
Ventura Alvarado	DF	USA	2021	1	0	1	0	
Mikey Ambrose	DF	USA	2020	6	1	7	1	
Luis Argudo	MF	USA	2020	1	0	1	0	
Dixon Arroyo	MF	Ecuador	2023	24	1	35	1	
Tomás Avilés	DF	Argentina	2023–2025	63	3	87	4	
Edison Azcona	MF	Dominican Republic	2021–2023	10	0	11	0	
**David Ayala**	MF	Argentina	2026–	17	0	20	0	
**Germán Berterame**	FW	Mexico	2026–	30	10	34	10	
Israel Boatwright	DF	Dominican Republic	2023	2	0	2	0	
Shanyder Borgelin	FW	Haiti	2023–2024	16	1	19	2	
**Yannick Bright**	MF	Italy	2024–	76	1	105	2	
Sergio Busquets	MF	Spain	2023–2025	74	1	116	1	
**Fricio Caicedo**	DF	Ecuador	2026–	6	0	10	0	
Leonardo Campana	FW	Ecuador	2022–2024	80	28	100	32	
Julián Carranza	FW	Argentina	2020–2021	41	3	42	3	
Pep Casas	MF	Spain	2024	2	0	2	0	
**Casemiro**	MF	Brazil	2026–	18	3	23	4	
Jay Chapman	MF	Canada	2020–2021	33	0	33	0	
Benjamin Cremaschi	MF	USA	2023–2025	72	7	107	8	
**Rodrigo De Paul**	MF	Argentina	2025–	40	6	59	9	
A. J. DeLaGarza	DF	Guam	2020	5	0	6	0	
**Lovend's Delinois**	FW	Haiti	2026–	2	0	4	0	
Bryce Duke	MF	USA	2022–2023	35	1	39	1	
**Maximiliano Falcón**	DF	Uruguay	2025–	43	1	68	1	
Facundo Farías	MF	Argentina	2023–2024	11	3	13	3	
Nicolás Figal	DF	Argentina	2020–2021	45	1	46	1	
**Ian Fray**	DF	USA / Jamaica (Note: Fray switched his international allegiance from USA (45 MLS, 60 total games, 4 goals) to Jamaica on October 10, 2025.)	2021–	72	6	97	6	
Nicolás Freire	DF	Argentina	2024	10	0	14	0	
**Matías Galarza**	MF	Paraguay	2026–	9	0	11	0	
Kieran Gibbs	DF	England	2021–2022	27	1	28	1	
Diego Gómez	MF	Paraguay	2023–2024	24	4	40	7	
Leandro González Pírez	DF	Argentina	2020–2021	46	2	46	2	
Gregore	MF	Brazil	2021–2023	64	0	67	0	
Julian Gressel	DF	USA	2024–2025	32	1	40	1	
Sami Guediri	DF	USA	2021	10	0	10	0	
Federico Higuaín	MF	Argentina	2020–2021	29	3	29	3	
Gonzalo Higuaín	FW	Argentina	2020–2022	67	29	70	29	
Corentin Jean	FW	France	2022–2023	18	1	20	1	
Joevin Jones	DF	Trinidad and Tobago	2021–2022	18	0	20	0	
Jerome Kiesewetter	FW	USA	2020	2	0	2	0	
Serhiy Kryvtsov	DF	Ukraine	2023–2024	49	2	63	2	
Jake LaCava	FW	USA	2023	0	0	2	0	
Ariel Lassiter	FW	Costa Rica	2022–2023	37	4	41	6	
Kelvin Leerdam	DF	Suriname	2021	29	0	29	0	
Damion Lowe	DF	Jamaica	2022	28	1	31	1	
**Gonzalo Luján**	DF	Argentina	2025–	50	1	69	1	
Aimé Mabika	DF	Zambia	2021–2022	17	0	20	0	
Christian Makoun	DF	Venezuela	2020–2021	30	2	30	2	
David Martínez	DF	Paraguay	2024–2025	13	1	21	2	
Josef Martínez	FW	Venezuela	2023	27	7	40	12	
Blaise Matuidi	MF	France	2020–2021	47	2	48	2	
Christopher McVey	DF	Sweden	2022–2023	50	1	61	1	
**Lionel Messi**	FW	Argentina	2023–	84	76	125	107	
**Micael**	DF	Brazil	2026–	25	1	32	2	
Kamal Miller	DF	Canada	2023	22	0	35	0	
**Santiago Morales**	MF	USA	2024–	7	0	8	0	
Lewis Morgan	MF	Scotland	2020–2021	57	7	58	7	
Jean Mota	MF	Brazil	2022–2024	48	2	53	3	
**Facundo Mura**	DF	Argentina	2026–	26	0	33	0	
Dylan Nealis	DF	USA	2020	19	0	20	0	
Franco Negri	DF	Argentina	2023–2024	27	1	32	2	
Harvey Neville	DF	Ireland	2022–2023	12	0	15	0	
Lee Nguyen	MF	USA	2020	5	0	5	0	
Allen Obando	FW	Ecuador	2025	6	1	7	1	
Matías Pellegrini	MF	Argentina	2020	19	1	20	1	
Joshua Penn	DF	USA	2021	2	0	2	0	
Fafà Picault	FW	Haiti	2025	20	4	28	4	
**Dániel Pintér**	FW	USA	2025–	15	1	18	2	
Rodolfo Pizarro	MF	Mexico	2020–2023	59	7	62	7	
**Preston Plambeck**	MF	USA	2026–	6	1	8	1	
Alvas Powell	DF	Jamaica	2020	4	0	5	0	
Alejandro Pozuelo	MF	Spain	2022	12	2	13	2	
Jairo Quinteros	DF	Bolivia	2022	4	0	6	0	
Federico Redondo	MF	Argentina	2024–2025	36	2	60	3	
**Sergio Reguilón**	DF	Spain	2026–	20	1	25	1	
Andrés Reyes	DF	Colombia	2020	13	0	13	0	
**Riquelme Fillipi**	FW	Brazil	2026–	7	1	7	1	
Robbie Robinson	FW	USA	2020–2024	53	6	58	7	
Baltasar Rodríguez	MF	Argentina	2025	14	3	22	3	
Emerson Rodríguez	FW	Colombia	2022	22	2	25	2	
Matías Rojas	MF	Paraguay	2024	14	4	20	9	
David Ruiz	MF	Honduras	2023–2026	61	3	82	4	
Ryan Sailor	DF	USA	2022–2025	44	0	49	1	
**Telasco Segovia**	MF	Venezuela	2025–	61	11	91	17	
**Alexander Shaw**	MF	USA	2026–	7	1	9	1	
Ryan Shawcross	DF	England	2021	12	0	12	0	
Brek Shea	DF	USA	2020–2022	47	6	47	6	
**Mateo Silvetti**	FW	Argentina	2025–	17	3	26	5	
Nicolás Stefanelli	FW	Argentina	2023	25	2	30	4	
**Luis Suárez**	FW	Uruguay	2024–	85	47	120	59	
Lawson Sunderland	MF	USA	2023–2024	7	0	8	0	
Ben Sweat	DF	USA	2020	22	0	23	0	
Robert Taylor	MF	Finland	2022–2025	91	13	116	18	
Román Torres	DF	Panama	2020	5	0	5	0	
Wil Trapp	MF	USA	2020	21	0	22	0	
Víctor Ulloa	MF	Mexico	2020–2023	73	0	82	0	
Indiana Vassilev	MF	USA	2021–2022	45	5	48	5	
Marcelo Weigandt	DF	Argentina	2024–2025	47	1	71	2	
DeAndre Yedlin	DF	USA	2022–2024	65	0	82	0	

=== Goalkeepers ===
Name	Country	Years	MLS		Total		Ref.
Name	Country	Years	Games	Shutouts	Games	Shutouts	Ref.
Drake Callender	USA	2020–2025	92	14	118	18	
Clément Diop	Senegal	2022	3	1	3	1	
CJ dos Santos	USA	2022–2024	2	0	3	1	
Nick Marsman	Netherlands	2021–2023	29	6	30	7	
John McCarthy	USA	2020–2021	21	3	22	3	
**Rocco Ríos Novo**	Argentina	2025–	16	4	28	6	
Luis Robles	USA	2020	15	2	15	2	
**Dayne St. Clair**	Canada	2026–	28	4	32	6	
Oscar Ustari	Argentina	2024–2025	26	4	41	8	

== By nationality ==
MLS regulations permit teams to name eight players from outside of the United States in their rosters. However, this limit can be exceeded by trading international slots with another MLS team, or if one or more of the overseas players is a refugee or has permanent residency rights in the United States.

Statistics correct as of May 26, 2026.

Country	Players	MLS		Total	
Country	Players	Games	Goals	Games	Goals
Argentina	23	718	135	947	186
Bolivia	1	4	0	6	0
Brazil	4	140	5	154	6
Canada	3	69	0	84	0
Colombia	2	35	2	38	2
Costa Rica	1	37	4	41	6
Dominican Republic	2	12	0	13	0
Ecuador	3	110	30	142	34
England	3	47	1	50	1
Finland	1	91	13	116	18
France	2	65	3	68	3
Greece	1	36	0	57	0
Guam	1	5	0	6	0
Haiti	2	36	5	47	6
Honduras	1	56	3	75	4
Ireland	1	12	0	15	0
Italy	1	62	1	86	1
Jamaica	3	44	2	54	2
Mexico	3	147	14	161	14
Netherlands	1	29	0	30	0
Panama	1	5	0	5	0
Paraguay	3	51	9	81	18
Scotland	1	57	7	58	7
Senegal	1	3	0	3	0
Spain	5	159	15	241	19
Suriname	1	29	0	29	0
Sweden	1	50	1	61	1
Trinidad and Tobago	1	18	0	20	0
Ukraine	1	49	2	63	2
Uruguay	2	99	36	156	49
USA	33	747	35	895	38
Venezuela	3	102	19	141	29
Zambia	1	17	0	20	0

== See also ==
- List of Inter Miami CF records and statistics
- List of Inter Miami CF seasons
