= 2025 Leagues Cup league phase =

Soccer tournament results

The 2025 Leagues Cup league phase began on July 29 and ended on August 7. A total of 36 teams competed in the league phase to decide the 8 places in the knockout stage of the 2025 Leagues Cup. The league phase schedule was announced on February 11.

== League phase table ==
=== Liga MX ===
Pos	Team	Pld	W	PW	PL	L	GF	GA	GD	Pts	Qualification
1	Toluca	3	2	1	0	0	6	4	+2	8	Advance to knockout stage
2	Pachuca	3	2	0	1	0	6	4	+2	7	Advance to knockout stage
3	Tigres UANL	3	2	0	0	1	7	4	+3	6	Advance to knockout stage
4	Puebla	3	2	0	0	1	6	4	+2	6	Advance to knockout stage
5	Juárez	3	1	1	1	0	7	4	+3	6	
6	Guadalajara	3	1	1	0	1	4	4	0	5	
7	Mazatlán	3	1	1	0	1	3	3	0	5	
8	Pumas UNAM	3	1	1	0	1	5	6	−1	5	
9	Atlético San Luis	3	1	1	0	1	4	6	−2	5	
10	América	3	0	2	1	0	6	6	0	5	
11	Necaxa	3	1	0	1	1	6	8	−2	4	
12	Cruz Azul	3	0	2	0	1	3	10	−7	4	
13	Tijuana	3	1	0	0	2	5	8	−3	3	
14	Monterrey	3	0	1	0	2	3	6	−3	2	
15	León	3	0	0	1	2	1	4	−3	1	
16	Querétaro	3	0	0	0	3	1	6	−5	0	
17	Atlas	3	0	0	0	3	3	9	−6	0	
18	Santos Laguna	3	0	0	0	3	2	8	−6	0	

Source: Leagues Cup

=== Major League Soccer ===
Pos	Team	Pld	W	PW	PL	L	GF	GA	GD	Pts	Qualification
1	Seattle Sounders FC	3	3	0	0	0	11	2	+9	9	Advance to knockout stage
2	Inter Miami CF	3	2	1	0	0	7	4	+3	8	Advance to knockout stage
3	LA Galaxy	3	2	0	1	0	10	3	+7	7	Advance to knockout stage
4	Orlando City SC	3	2	0	1	0	9	3	+6	7	Advance to knockout stage
5	Portland Timbers	3	2	0	1	0	6	1	+5	7	
6	Columbus Crew	3	2	0	1	0	6	3	+3	7	
7	Real Salt Lake	3	1	1	1	0	5	4	+1	6	
8	Los Angeles FC	3	1	1	1	0	4	3	+1	6	
9	New York Red Bulls	3	1	1	1	0	3	2	+1	6	
10	Minnesota United FC	3	1	0	1	1	7	6	+1	4	
11	FC Cincinnati	3	1	0	1	1	6	6	0	4	
12	Colorado Rapids	3	1	0	1	1	5	5	0	4	
13	Charlotte FC	3	1	0	1	1	5	6	−1	4	
14	Atlanta United FC	3	1	0	0	2	7	7	0	3	
15	San Diego FC	3	1	0	0	2	5	5	0	3	
16	New York City FC	3	1	0	0	2	3	5	−2	3	
17	CF Montréal	3	0	1	0	2	3	5	−2	2	
18	Houston Dynamo FC	3	0	0	0	3	2	8	−6	0	

Source: Leagues Cup

== Results summary ==
The matches were played on July 29–31, August 1–3, and August 5–7, 2025.

Times are EDT (UTC−4), as listed by CONCACAF (local times, if different, are in parentheses).

Matchday 1
Team 1	Score	Team 2
Toluca (Mexico)	2–2 (4–2 p)	(United States) Columbus Crew
Tigres UANL (Mexico)	4–1	(United States) Houston Dynamo FC
Los Angeles FC (United States)	1–1 (10–11 p)	(Mexico) Mazatlán
CF Montréal (Canada)	1–1 (7–6 p)	(Mexico) León
New York City FC (United States)	0–3	(Mexico) Puebla
Pachuca (Mexico)	3–2	(United States) San Diego FC
Necaxa (Mexico)	3–1	(United States) Atlanta United FC
Inter Miami CF (United States)	2–1	(Mexico) Atlas
Minnesota United FC (United States)	4–1	(Mexico) Querétaro
Pumas UNAM (Mexico)	1–1 (4–3 p)	(United States) Orlando City SC
Portland Timbers (United States)	4–0	(Mexico) Atlético San Luis
América (Mexico)	2–2 (1–3 p)	(United States) Real Salt Lake
Monterrey (Mexico)	2–3	(United States) FC Cincinnati
Charlotte FC (United States)	1–4	(Mexico) Juárez
Colorado Rapids (United States)	2–1	(Mexico) Santos Laguna
LA Galaxy (United States)	5–2	(Mexico) Tijuana
Guadalajara (Mexico)	0–1	(United States) New York Red Bulls
Cruz Azul (Mexico)	0–7	(United States) Seattle Sounders FC

Matchday 2
Team 1	Score	Team 2
Columbus Crew (United States)	3–1	(Mexico) Puebla
Houston Dynamo FC (United States)	0–2	(Mexico) Mazatlán
Los Angeles FC (United States)	1–1 (4–2 p)	(Mexico) Pachuca
Toluca (Mexico)	2–1	(Canada) CF Montréal
New York City FC (United States)	2–0	(Mexico) León
Tigres UANL (Mexico)	2–1	(United States) San Diego FC
Pumas UNAM (Mexico)	3–2	(United States) Atlanta United FC
Inter Miami CF (United States)	2–2 (5–4 p)	(Mexico) Necaxa
América (Mexico)	3–3 (8–7 p)	(United States) Minnesota United FC
Orlando City SC (United States)	3–1	(Mexico) Atlas
Portland Timbers (United States)	1–0	(Mexico) Querétaro
Real Salt Lake (United States)	2–2 (1–4 p)	(Mexico) Atlético San Luis
FC Cincinnati (United States)	2–2 (3–4 p)	(Mexico) Juárez
Guadalajara (Mexico)	2–2 (4–2 p)	(United States) Charlotte FC
Colorado Rapids (United States)	1–2	(Mexico) Tijuana
LA Galaxy (United States)	1–1 (7–8 p)	(Mexico) Cruz Azul
Monterrey (Mexico)	1–1 (5–3 p)	(United States) New York Red Bulls
Seattle Sounders FC (United States)	2–1	(Mexico) Santos Laguna

Matchday 3
Team 1	Score	Team 2
Columbus Crew (United States)	1–0	(Mexico) León
Houston Dynamo FC (United States)	1–2	(Mexico) Pachuca
Tigres UANL (Mexico)	1–2	(United States) Los Angeles FC
CF Montréal (Canada)	1–2	(Mexico) Puebla
Toluca (Mexico)	2–1	(United States) New York City FC
Mazatlán (Mexico)	0–2	(United States) San Diego FC
Atlanta United FC (United States)	4–1	(Mexico) Atlas
Inter Miami CF (United States)	3–1	(Mexico) Pumas UNAM
Minnesota United FC (United States)	0–2	(Mexico) Atlético San Luis
Orlando City SC (United States)	5–1	(Mexico) Necaxa
América (Mexico)	1–1 (5–3 p)	(United States) Portland Timbers
Real Salt Lake (United States)	1–0	(Mexico) Querétaro
Seattle Sounders FC (United States)	2–1	(Mexico) Tijuana
FC Cincinnati (United States)	1–2	(Mexico) Guadalajara
Monterrey (Mexico)	0–2	(United States) Charlotte FC
Cruz Azul (Mexico)	2–2 (5–4 p)	(United States) Colorado Rapids
LA Galaxy (United States)	4–0	(Mexico) Santos Laguna
New York Red Bulls (United States)	1–1 (5–3 p)	(Mexico) Juárez

=== Matchday 1 ===
July 29, 2025
19:00

CF Montréal (Canada)	1–1	(Mexico) León
Owusu 62'	Report	Funes Mori 11'
Penalties
Waterman (penalty scored); Craig (penalty scored); Duke (penalty scored); Escobar (penalty scored); Owusu (penalty scored); Petrasso (penalty scored); Pearce (penalty scored)	7–6	(penalty scored) J. Rodríguez; (penalty scored) Frías; (penalty scored) Rigoni; (penalty scored) Ayón; (penalty scored) Echeverría; (penalty scored) Gauthier; (penalty missed) Santos

Saputo Stadium, Montreal, Quebec
Attendance: 14,272
Referee: Pierre-Luc Lauzière (Canada)

July 29, 2025
19:00

Toluca (Mexico)	2–2	(United States) Columbus Crew
Paulinho 71', 80'	Report	Rossi 11' (pen.); Arfsten 48'
Penalties
Vega (penalty scored); García (penalty scored); Méndez (penalty missed); Gallardo (penalty scored); Helinho (penalty scored)	4–2	(penalty missed) Rossi; (penalty missed) Sejdić; (penalty scored) Habroune; (penalty scored) Lappalainen

Lower.com Field, Columbus, Ohio
Attendance: 10,916
Referee: Oshane Nation (Jamaica)

July 29, 2025
20:00

New York City FC (United States)	0–3	(Mexico) Puebla
	Report	Fedorco 2'; E. Gómez 38'; González 88'

Sports Illustrated Stadium, Harrison, New Jersey
Attendance: 9,384
Referee: Iván Barton (El Salvador)

July 29, 2025
21:00 (20:00 UTC−5)

Tigres UANL (Mexico)	4–1	(United States) Houston Dynamo FC
Correa 45+3', 70'; Lainez 63'; Herrera 90+7'	Report	Lingr 47'

Shell Energy Stadium, Houston, Texas
Attendance: 21,792
Referee: Walter López (Guatemala)

July 29, 2025
22:30 (19:30 UTC−7)

Los Angeles FC (United States)	1–1	(Mexico) Mazatlán
Martínez 29'	Report	Fábio 31'
Penalties
Bouanga (penalty scored); Delgado (penalty missed); Tillman (penalty scored); Martínez (penalty scored); Segura (penalty scored); Palencia (penalty scored); Ordaz (penalty scored); Smolyakov (penalty scored); Igor Jesus (penalty scored); Tafari (penalty scored); Ochoa (penalty scored); Bouanga (penalty missed)	10–11	(penalty scored) Benedetti; (penalty missed) Samir; (penalty scored) Colula; (penalty scored) Hernández; (penalty scored) Torres; (penalty scored) Merolla; (penalty scored) Duarte; (penalty scored) Fierro; (penalty scored) S. Rodríguez; (penalty scored) García; (penalty scored) R. Rodríguez; (penalty scored) Benedetti

BMO Stadium, Los Angeles, California
Attendance: 11,409
Referee: Fernando Hernández (Mexico)

July 29, 2025
23:00 (20:00 UTC−7)

Pachuca (Mexico)	3–2	(United States) San Diego FC
Guzmán 23'; Domínguez 45+3', 67'	Report	Boateng 88'; Bombino 90+10'

Snapdragon Stadium, San Diego, California
Attendance: 21,872
Referee: Katja Koroleva (United States)

July 30, 2025
19:30

Necaxa (Mexico)	3–1	(United States) Atlanta United FC
Guzan 12' (o.g.); Badaloni 77', 90+1'	Report	Miranchuk 28'

Mercedes-Benz Stadium, Atlanta, Georgia
Attendance: 30,847
Referee: Marco Ortíz (Mexico)

July 30, 2025
19:30

Inter Miami CF (United States)	2–1	(Mexico) Atlas
Segovia 58'; Weigandt 90+6'	Report	Lozano 80'

Chase Stadium, Fort Lauderdale, Florida
Attendance: 19,876
Referee: Juan Gabriel Calderón (Costa Rica)

July 30, 2025
20:00

Pumas UNAM (Mexico)	1–1	(United States) Orlando City SC
Carrasquilla 80'	Report	Schlegel 5'
Penalties
Martínez (penalty missed); Angulo (penalty scored); Nathan (penalty scored); Quispe (penalty scored); Carrasquilla (penalty scored)	4–3	(penalty scored) Ojeda; (penalty missed) Atuesta; (penalty scored) Smith; (penalty missed) Araújo; (penalty scored) Muriel

Inter&Co Stadium, Orlando, Florida
Attendance: 14,744
Referee: Adonai Escobedo (Mexico)

July 30, 2025
20:30 (19:30 UTC−5)

Minnesota United FC (United States)	4–1	(Mexico) Querétaro
Hlongwane 11'; Yeboah 20'; Markanich 79'; Oluwaseyi 90+1'	Report	Julio 67'

Allianz Field, Saint Paul, Minnesota
Attendance: 14,469
Referee: David Gómez (Costa Rica)

July 30, 2025
21:30 (19:30 UTC−6)

América (Mexico)	2–2	(United States) Real Salt Lake
Rodríguez 42'; Sánchez 90+7'	Report	Luna 16'; Agada 45+2'
Penalties
Martín (penalty missed); Fidalgo (penalty scored); Reyes (penalty missed); Zúñiga (penalty missed)	1–3	(penalty scored) Ruiz; (penalty scored) Glad; (penalty scored) Vera; (penalty missed) Ojeda

America First Field, Sandy, Utah
Attendance: 19,544
Referee: Saíd Martínez (Honduras)

July 30, 2025
22:30 (19:30 UTC−7)

Portland Timbers (United States)	4–0	(Mexico) Atlético San Luis
Da Costa 1'; Kelsy 56'; Lassiter 73'; Mora 78'	Report

Providence Park, Portland, Oregon
Attendance: 11,515
Referee: Ismael Cornejo (El Salvador)

July 31, 2025
19:00

Monterrey (Mexico)	2–3	(United States) FC Cincinnati
Canales 45'; Berterame 90+4'	Report	Evander 31'; Orellano 53'; Bucha 90'

TQL Stadium, Cincinnati, Ohio
Attendance: 24,860
Referee: Katia García (Mexico)

July 31, 2025
19:30

Charlotte FC (United States)	1–4	(Mexico) Juárez
Toklomati 18'	Report	Madson 7', 21'; Mosquera 45+2'; Estupiñán 90'

Bank of America Stadium, Charlotte, North Carolina
Attendance: 23,677
Referee: Natalie Simon (United States)

July 31, 2025
19:30

Guadalajara (Mexico)	0–1	(United States) New York Red Bulls
	Report	Forsberg 90+7'

Sports Illustrated Stadium, Harrison, New Jersey
Attendance: 14,954
Referee: Lukasz Szpala (United States)

July 31, 2025
21:30 (19:30 UTC−6)

Colorado Rapids (United States)	2–1	(Mexico) Santos Laguna
Navarro 62', 87'	Report	Carrillo 53'

Dick's Sporting Goods Park, Commerce City, Colorado
Attendance: 13,662
Referee: Kwinsi Williams (Trinidad and Tobago

July 31, 2025
22:30 (19:30 UTC−7)

Cruz Azul (Mexico)	0–7	(United States) Seattle Sounders FC
	Report	Yeimar 48'; Vargas 50'; Ferreira 58'; De Rosario 69'; De la Vega 76', 90+1'; Nouhou 88'

Lumen Field, Seattle, Washington
Attendance: 22,697
Referee: Víctor Cáceres (Mexico)

July 31, 2025
23:00 (20:00 UTC−7)

LA Galaxy (United States)	5–2	(Mexico) Tijuana
Nascimento 17' (pen.); Gabriel Pec 39'; Paintsil 65', 90+1'; Reus 82'	Report	Mora 21', 59'

Dignity Health Sports Park, Carson, California
Attendance: 15,183
Referee: Mario Escobar (Guatemala)

=== Matchday 2 ===
August 1, 2025
18:00

New York City FC (United States)	2–0	(Mexico) León
Martínez 7'; Ojeda 32'	Report

Sports Illustrated Stadium, Harrison, New Jersey
Attendance: 12,149
Referee: Reon Radix (Grenada)

August 1, 2025
19:00

Columbus Crew (United States)	3–1	(Mexico) Puebla
Amundsen 14'; Rossi 16'; Herrera 39'	Report	Lozano 45+1'

Lower.com Field, Columbus, Ohio
Attendance: 20,211
Referee: Filip Dujic (Canada)

August 1, 2025
20:30 (19:30 UTC−5)

Houston Dynamo FC (United States)	0–2	(Mexico) Mazatlán
	Report	Almada 25'; Fábio 57'

Shell Energy Stadium, Houston, Texas
Attendance: 10,126
Referee: Marianela Araya (Costa Rica)

August 1, 2025
21:00

Toluca (Mexico)	2–1	(Canada) CF Montréal
Angulo 23'; Paulinho 26'	Report	Morales 20'

Sports Illustrated Stadium, Harrison, New Jersey
Attendance: 12,149
Referee: José Torres (Puerto Rico)

August 1, 2025
22:30 (19:30 UTC−7)

Los Angeles FC (United States)	1–1	(Mexico) Pachuca
Bouanga 10'	Report	Montiel 32'
Penalties
Bouanga (penalty scored); Delgado (penalty scored); Palencia (penalty scored); Segura (penalty scored)	4–2	(penalty missed) López; (penalty scored) Guzmán; (penalty scored) Togni; (penalty missed) Bautista

BMO Stadium, Los Angeles, California
Attendance: 14,733
Referee: Bryan López (Guatemala)

August 1, 2025
23:00 (20:00 UTC−7)

Tigres UANL (Mexico)	2–1	(United States) San Diego FC
Correa 31', 67'	Report	Ángel 55'

Snapdragon Stadium, San Diego, California
Attendance: 25,915
Referee: César Ramos (Mexico)

August 2, 2025
18:00

Orlando City SC (United States)	3–1	(Mexico) Atlas
Angulo 9'; Ojeda 57'; Pašalić 90+13'	Report	Cóccaro 50'

Inter&Co Stadium, Orlando, Florida
Attendance: 15,722
Referee: Humberto Panjoj (Guatemala)

August 2, 2025
19:00

Inter Miami CF (United States)	2–2	(Mexico) Necaxa
Segovia 12'; Alba 90+2'	Report	Badaloni 33'; Monreal 81'
Penalties
De Paul (penalty scored); Cremaschi (penalty scored); Alba (penalty scored); Redondo (penalty scored); Suárez (penalty scored)	5–4	(penalty scored) Palavecino; (penalty scored) Rojas; (penalty missed) Badaloni; (penalty scored) Monreal; (penalty scored) Unsain

Chase Stadium, Fort Lauderdale, Florida
Attendance: 20,043
Referee: Daniel Quintero (Mexico)

August 2, 2025
21:00 (20:00 UTC−5)

América (Mexico)	3–3	(United States) Minnesota United FC
Boxall 27' (o.g.); Zúñiga 53'; Cáceres 90'	Report	Oluwaseyi 17'; Hlongwane 31'; Harvey 65'
Penalties
Rodríguez (penalty scored); Zendejas (penalty scored); Cáceres (penalty scored); Reyes (penalty scored); Aguirre (penalty scored); Borja (penalty scored); Sánchez (penalty scored); Violante (penalty scored)	8–7	(penalty scored) Pereyra; (penalty scored) Yeboah; (penalty scored) Trapp; (penalty scored) Harvey; (penalty scored) Gressel; (penalty scored) Rosales; (penalty scored) Boxall; (penalty missed) Romero

Shell Energy Stadium, Houston, Texas
Attendance: 13,885
Referee: Drew Fischer (Canada)

August 2, 2025
21:00

Pumas UNAM (Mexico)	3–2	(United States) Atlanta United FC
Angulo 23' (pen.); Carrasquilla 62', 89'	Report	Navas 35' (o.g.); Latte Lath 43'

Inter&Co Stadium, Orlando, Florida
Attendance: 15,722
Referee: Keylor Herrera (Costa Rica)

August 2, 2025
21:30 (19:30 UTC−6)

Real Salt Lake (United States)	2–2	(Mexico) Atlético San Luis
Ojeda 9', 88'	Report	João Pedro 24'; García 82'
Penalties
Vera (penalty missed); Glad (penalty missed); Russell (penalty scored)	1–4	(penalty scored) João Pedro; (penalty scored) Galdames; (penalty scored) García; (penalty scored) Cruz

America First Field, Sandy, Utah
Attendance: 16,637
Referee: Nelson Salgado (Honduras)

August 2, 2025
23:00 (20:00 UTC−7)

Portland Timbers (United States)	1–0	(Mexico) Querétaro
Paredes 36'	Report

Providence Park, Portland, Oregon
Attendance: 13,355
Referee: Jesús López (Mexico)

August 3, 2025
17:30

FC Cincinnati (United States)	2–2	(Mexico) Juárez
Evander 72'; Estupiñán 77' (o.g.)	Report	Ricardinho 39'; Castilho 63'
Penalties
Engel (penalty scored); Orellano (penalty scored); Miazga (penalty missed); Bucha (penalty scored); Evander (penalty missed)	3–4	(penalty scored) Estupiñán; (penalty scored) Villalpando; (penalty scored) Pizarro; (penalty scored) D. García; (penalty missed) Torres

TQL Stadium, Cincinnati, Ohio
Attendance: 17,314
Referee: Alyssa Nichols (United States)

August 3, 2025
19:50

Guadalajara (Mexico)	2–2	(United States) Charlotte FC
Ledezma 24'; B. González 66'	Report	Abada 11'; Vargas 90'
Penalties
Sepúlveda (penalty scored); Gómez (penalty scored); Romo (penalty missed); Cowell (penalty scored); A. González (penalty scored)	4–2	(penalty missed) Williamson; (penalty scored) Petković; (penalty scored) Bronico; (penalty missed) Smalls

Bank of America Stadium, Charlotte, North Carolina
Attendance: 24,207
Referee: Luis Enrique Santander (Mexico)

August 3, 2025
20:30

Monterrey (Mexico)	1–1	(United States) New York Red Bulls
Canales 38'	Report	Hall 19'
Penalties
Canales (penalty scored); Fimbres (penalty scored); Corona (penalty scored); Ramos (penalty scored); Reyes (penalty scored)	5–3	(penalty scored) Eile; (penalty missed) Hack; (penalty scored) Bogacz; (penalty scored) Edelman

TQL Stadium, Cincinnati, Ohio
Attendance: 17,314
Referee: Guido Gonzales Jr. (United States)

August 3, 2025
21:30 (19:30 UTC−6)

Colorado Rapids (United States)	1–2	(Mexico) Tijuana
Porozo 74' (o.g.)	Report	Porozo 39'; Árciga 72'

Dick's Sporting Goods Park, Commerce City, Colorado
Attendance: 13,717
Referee: Karen Hernández (Mexico)

August 3, 2025
22:30 (19:30 UTC−7)

LA Galaxy (United States)	1–1	(Mexico) Cruz Azul
Gabriel Pec 81'	Report	Rodríguez 22'
Penalties
Reus (penalty scored); Gabriel Pec (penalty scored); Nascimento (penalty scored); Fagúndez (penalty scored); Paintsil (penalty scored); Cuevas (penalty scored); Nelson (penalty scored); Cerrillo (penalty missed); Garcés (penalty missed)	7–8	(penalty scored) Lira; (penalty scored) Rivero; (penalty scored) Piovi; (penalty scored) Rodríguez; (penalty scored) Ditta; (penalty scored) Márquez; (penalty scored) Romero; (penalty missed) Orozco; (penalty scored) Levy

Dignity Health Sports Park, Carson, California
Attendance: 24,285
Referee: Filiberto Martínez (El Salvador)

August 3, 2025
22:30 (19:30 UTC−7)

Seattle Sounders FC (United States)	2–1	(Mexico) Santos Laguna
Ortega 8' (o.g.); Minoungou 72'	Report	Dájome 90+6'

Lumen Field, Seattle, Washington
Attendance: 17,265
Referee: Steffon Dewar (Jamaica)

=== Matchday 3 ===
August 5, 2025
19:30

Columbus Crew (United States)	1–0	(Mexico) León
Arfsten 53'	Report

Lower.com Field, Columbus, Ohio
Attendance: 13,465
Referee: Selvin Brown (Honduras)

August 5, 2025
19:30

Toluca (Mexico)	2–1	(United States) New York City FC
Angulo 37'; Paulinho 39'	Report	Martínez 10'

Yankee Stadium, New York City, New York
Attendance: 18,496
Referee: Pierre-Luc Lauzière (Canada)

August 5, 2025
20:00

CF Montréal (Canada)	1–2	(Mexico) Puebla
Owusu 47'	Report	Gómez 58'; Marín 73'

Saputo Stadium, Montreal, Quebec
Attendance: 9,368
Referee: Adonai Escobedo (Mexico)

August 5, 2025
20:30 (19:30 UTC−5)

Houston Dynamo FC (United States)	1–2	(Mexico) Pachuca
Bassi 82' (pen.)	Report	Quiñones 25'; Togni 85'

Shell Energy Stadium, Houston, Texas
Attendance: 9,383
Referee: Adonis Carrasco (Dominican Republic)

August 5, 2025
22:00 (19:00 UTC−7)

Mazatlán (Mexico)	0–2	(United States) San Diego FC
	Report	Valakari 66', 74'

Snapdragon Stadium, San Diego, California
Attendance: 5,709
Referee: Walter López (Guatemala)

August 5, 2025
22:30 (19:30 UTC−7)

Tigres UANL (Mexico)	1–2	(United States) Los Angeles FC
López 48'	Report	Martínez 38' (pen.), 64'

BMO Stadium, Los Angeles, California
Attendance: 15,852
Referee: Saíd Martínez (Honduras)

August 6, 2025
19:00

Orlando City SC (United States)	5–1	(Mexico) Necaxa
Ojeda 15', 51'; Muriel 35', 37', 45+1'	Report	Peña 71'

Inter&Co Stadium, Orlando, Florida
Attendance: 13,255
Referee: Fernando Hernández (Mexico)

August 6, 2025
19:30

Inter Miami CF (United States)	3–1	(Mexico) Pumas UNAM
De Paul 45'; Suárez 59' (pen.); Allende 69'	Report	Ruvalcaba 34'

Chase Stadium, Fort Lauderdale, Florida
Attendance: 18,824
Referee: Ismael Cornejo (El Salvador)

August 6, 2025
19:30

Atlanta United FC (United States)	4–1	(Mexico) Atlas
Thiaré 8' (pen.); Miranchuk 33'; Lobzhanidze 38'; Togashi 68'	Report	González 83'

Mercedes-Benz Stadium, Atlanta, Georgia
Attendance: 22,342
Referee: Katia García (Mexico)

August 6, 2025
20:30 (19:30 UTC−5)

Minnesota United FC (United States)	0–2	(Mexico) Atlético San Luis
	Report	João Pedro 45+1'; Pérez Bouquet 89'

Allianz Field, Saint Paul, Minnesota
Attendance: 14,607
Referee: Oshane Nation (Jamaica)

August 6, 2025
21:30 (20:30 UTC−5)

América (Mexico)	1–1	(United States) Portland Timbers
Juárez 53'	Report	Lassiter 7'
Penalties
Rodríguez (penalty scored); Zendejas (penalty scored); Reyes (penalty scored); Aguirre (penalty scored); Martín (penalty scored)	5–3	(penalty scored) Paredes; (penalty missed) K. Miller; (penalty scored) Antony; (penalty scored) Guerra

Q2 Stadium, Austin, Texas
Attendance: 9,796
Referee: Guido Gonzales Jr. (United States)

August 6, 2025
21:30 (19:30 UTC−6)

Real Salt Lake (United States)	1–0	(Mexico) Querétaro
Ojeda 32'	Report

America First Field, Sandy, Utah
Attendance: 16,164
Referee: Drew Fischer (Canada)

August 6, 2025
23:00 (20:00 UTC−7)

Seattle Sounders FC (United States)	2–1	(Mexico) Tijuana
De Rosario 56'; Musovski 87'	Report	Castañeda 45+4'

Lumen Field, Seattle, Washington
Attendance: 17,949
Referee: Katja Koroleva (United States)

August 7, 2025
19:00

FC Cincinnati (United States)	1–2	(Mexico) Guadalajara
Dávila 67'	Report	Álvarez 25' (pen.); González 57'

TQL Stadium, Cincinnati, Ohio
Attendance: 21,102
Referee: Rubiel Vazquez (United States)

August 7, 2025
19:30

Monterrey (Mexico)	0–2	(United States) Charlotte FC
	Report	Tuiloma 56'; Smalls 60'

Bank of America Stadium, Charlotte, North Carolina
Attendance: 18,877
Referee: Keylor Herrera (Costa Rica)

August 7, 2025
19:30

New York Red Bulls (United States)	1–1	(Mexico) Juárez
Nealis 47'	Report	Estupiñán 87'
Penalties
Choupo-Moting (penalty scored); Eile (penalty scored); Morales (penalty scored); Parker (penalty scored); Forsberg (penalty scored)	5–3	(penalty scored) Estupiñán; (penalty missed) Pizarro; (penalty scored) García; (penalty scored) Fulgencio

Sports Illustrated Stadium, Harrison, New Jersey
Attendance: 10,083
Referee: Víctor Cáceres (Mexico)

August 7, 2025
20:30 (17:30 UTC−7)

Cruz Azul (Mexico)	2–2	(United States) Colorado Rapids
Ditta 43'; Rivero 78'	Report	Navarro 3'; Maxsø 41'
Penalties
Lira (penalty scored); Bogusz (penalty scored); Paradela (penalty scored); Piovi (penalty scored); Rodríguez (penalty scored)	5–4	(penalty scored) Yapi; (penalty missed) Larraz; (penalty scored) Harris; (penalty scored) Wathuta; (penalty scored) Bassett

Dignity Health Sports Park, Carson, California
Attendance: 8,454
Referee: Joe Dickerson (United States)

August 7, 2025
23:35 (20:35 UTC−7)

LA Galaxy (United States)	4–0	(Mexico) Santos Laguna
Paintsil 1'; Nascimento 39', 74'; Yoshida 45+5'	Report

Dignity Health Sports Park, Carson, California
Attendance: 12,883
Referee: Mario Escobar (Guatemala)
