= 2022 Inter Miami CF season =

Inter Miami CF
2022 season
- President: David Beckham
- Head coach: Phil Neville
- Stadium: DRV PNK Stadium
- Major League Soccer: Conference: 6th Overall: 12th
- MLS Cup Playoffs: First round
- U.S. Open Cup: Round of 16
- Carolina Challenge Cup: Winners
- Top goalscorer: League: Gonzalo Higuaín (16); All: Gonzalo Higuaín (16)
- Highest home attendance: League/All: 15,973 (2/26 v. CHI)
- Lowest home attendance: League: 10,027 (7/13 v. PHI); All: 3,198 (5/10 v. TRM, USOC)
- Average home league attendance: 12,613
- Biggest win: MIA 4–1 ORL (10/5)
- Biggest defeat: ATX 5–1 MIA (3/6)
Home colors	Away colors

The 2022 Inter Miami CF season was the third season in the history of Inter Miami CF and the 19th season of first-division club soccer in South Florida. In addition to playing in Major League Soccer, the club participated in the U.S. Open Cup, the first cup competition in club history.

== Management ==
Position	Staff
Ownership
Lead Managing Owner	(United States) Jorge Mas
Co-Owner	(England) David Beckham
Co-Owner	(United States) Jose Mas
Front Office
Chief Business Officer	(Spain) Xavier Asensi
Sporting Director	(United States) Chris Henderson
Vice President	(United States) Pablo Alvarez
Coaching Staff
Head Coach	(England) Phil Neville
Assistant Coach	(United States) Jason Kreis
Assistant Coach	(Northern Ireland) Martin Paterson
Goalkeeper Coach	(England) Mark Mason
Assistant Goalkeeper Coach	(Argentina) Sebastián Saja
Performance Analyst	(England) Alec Scott
Performance Analyst	(England) Tom Childs

Last updated: January 22, 2022
Source: Inter Miami CF

== Roster ==
No.	Name	Nationality	Position	Date of birth (age)	Signed from
Goalkeepers
21	Nick Marsman	(Netherlands)	GK	October 1, 1990 (aged 31)	(Netherlands) Feyenoord
27	Drake Callender	(United States)	GK	October 7, 1997 (aged 24)	(United States) San Jose Earthquakes
29	CJ dos Santos	(United States)	GK	August 24, 2000 (aged 21)	(Portugal) Benfica
Defenders
2	DeAndre Yedlin	(United States)	DF	July 9, 1993 (aged 28)	(Turkey) Galatasaray
3	Kieran Gibbs	(England)	DF	September 26, 1989 (aged 32)	(England) West Bromwich Albion
4	Christopher McVey	(Sweden)	DF	April 12, 1997 (aged 24)	(Sweden) Elfsborg
12	Aimé Mabika	(Zambia)	DF	August 16, 1998 (aged 23)	(United States) Fort Lauderdale CF
18	Harvey Neville	(Republic of Ireland)	DF	June 26, 2002 (aged 19)	(United States) Inter Miami CF II
20	Brek Shea	(United States)	DF	February 28, 1990 (aged 31)	(United States) Atlanta United FC
24	Ian Fray	(United States)	DF	August 31, 2002 (aged 19)	(United States) Fort Lauderdale CF
31	Damion Lowe	(Jamaica)	DF	May 3, 1993 (aged 28)	(Egypt) Al Ittihad
32	Noah Allen	(United States)	DF	April 28, 2004 (aged 17)	(United States) Inter Miami CF II
33	Joevin Jones	(Trinidad and Tobago)	DF	August 3, 1991 (aged 30)	(United States) Seattle Sounders FC
45	Ryan Sailor	(United States)	DF	November 27, 1998 (aged 23)	(United States) University of Washington
Midfielders
7	Jean Mota	(Brazil)	MF	October 15, 1993 (aged 28)	(Brazil) Santos
8	Alejandro Pozuelo	(Spain)	MF	September 20, 1991 (aged 30)	(Canada) Toronto FC
13	Víctor Ulloa	(Mexico)	MF	March 4, 1992 (aged 29)	(United States) FC Cincinnati
16	Robert Taylor	(Finland)	MF	October 21, 1994 (aged 27)	(Norway) Brann
22	Bryce Duke	(United States)	MF	February 28, 2001 (aged 20)	(United States) Los Angeles FC
25	Emerson Rodríguez	(Colombia)	MF	August 25, 2000 (aged 21)	(Colombia) Millonarios
26	Gregore	(Brazil)	MF	March 2, 1994 (aged 27)	(Brazil) Bahia
30	George Acosta	(United States)	MF	January 19, 2000 (aged 22)	(United States) Austin Bold
35	Felipe Valencia	(United States)	MF	March 1, 2005 (aged 16)	(United States) Fort Lauderdale CF
Forwards
9	Leonardo Campana	(Ecuador)	FW	June 24, 2000 (aged 21)	(England) Wolverhampton Wanderers
10	Gonzalo Higuaín	(Argentina)	FW	December 10, 1987 (aged 34)	(Italy) Juventus
11	Ariel Lassiter	(Costa Rica)	FW	September 27, 1994 (aged 27)	(United States) Houston Dynamo FC
14	Corentin Jean	(France)	FW	July 15, 1995 (aged 26)	(France) Lens
17	Indiana Vassilev	(United States)	FW	February 16, 2001 (aged 21)	(England) Aston Villa
19	Robbie Robinson	(United States)	FW	December 17, 1998 (aged 23)	(United States) Clemson University

== Transfers ==
=== Transfers in ===
Date	Position	No.	Name	From	Fee	Ref.
Winter 2021–22
December 12, 2021	MF	7	(Brazil) Jean Mota	(Brazil) Santos	$500,000	
December 16, 2021	FW	11	(Costa Rica) Ariel Lassiter	(United States) Houston Dynamo FC	$100,000 GAM	
December 17, 2021	MF	6	(England) Mo Adams	(United States) Atlanta United FC	Trade	
January 1, 2022	DF	15	(Bolivia) Jairo Quinteros	(Bolivia) Club Bolivar	End of Loan	
January 4, 2022	MF	22	(United States) Bryce Duke	(United States) Los Angeles FC	$100,000 GAM	
January 11, 2022	GK	94	(Senegal) Clément Diop	(Canada) CF Montréal	Free	
January 13, 2022	DF	12	(Zambia) Aimé Mabika	(United States) Fort Lauderdale CF	Free	
January 14, 2022	DF	4	(Sweden) Christopher McVey	(Sweden) Elfsborg	$500,000	
January 16, 2022	DF	31	(Jamaica) Damion Lowe	(Egypt) Al Ittihad	Free	
January 19, 2022	MF	25	(Colombia) Emerson Rodríguez	(Colombia) Millonarios	$2,700,000	
January 20, 2022	FW	9	(Ecuador) Leonardo Campana	(England) Wolverhampton Wanderers	Loan	
February 2, 2022	DF	2	(United States) DeAndre Yedlin	(Turkey) Galatasaray	Free	
February 11, 2022	GK	29	(United States) CJ dos Santos	(Portugal) Benfica	Undisclosed	
February 11, 2022	MF	16	(Finland) Robert Taylor	(Norway) Brann	Undisclosed	
February 22, 2022	DF	45	(United States) Ryan Sailor	(United States) University of Washington	SuperDraft	
March 11, 2022	DF	32	(United States) Noah Allen	(United States) Inter Miami CF II	Homegrown Player	
Summer 2022
May 5, 2022	FW	17	(United States) Indiana Vassilev	(England) Aston Villa	Loan	
June 29, 2022	FW	14	(France) Corentin Jean	(France) Lens	Undisclosed	
July 7, 2022	MF	8	(Spain) Alejandro Pozuelo	(Canada) Toronto FC	$150,000 GAM	
August 23, 2022	DF	18	(Republic of Ireland) Harvey Neville	(United States) Inter Miami CF II	Homegrown Player	

=== Transfers out ===
Date	Position	No.	Name	To	Fee	Ref.
Winter 2021–22
November 15, 2021	DF	2	(Mexico) Ventura Alvarado	(Mexico) FC Juárez	Option Declined	
November 15, 2021	MF	14	(Canada) Jay Chapman	(Scotland) Dundee	Option Declined	
November 15, 2021	DF	35	(United States) Sami Guediri	(United States) Loudoun United	Option Declined	
November 15, 2021	MF	22	(Argentina) Federico Higuaín	(United States) Columbus Crew	Free	
November 15, 2021	DF	31	(Suriname) Kelvin Leerdam	(United States) LA Galaxy	Option Declined	
November 15, 2021	GK	1	(United States) John McCarthy	(United States) Los Angeles FC	Option Declined	
November 15, 2021	FW	16	(United States) Josh Penn	(United States) Chicago Fire FC II	Option Declined	
November 15, 2021	DF	15	(United States) Patrick Seagrist	(United States) Memphis 901	Option Declined	
December 12, 2021	MF	7	(Scotland) Lewis Morgan	(United States) New York Red Bulls	$1,200,000 GAM	
December 17, 2021	GK	18	(United States) Dylan Castanheira	(United States) Atlanta United FC	Trade	
December 23, 2021	FW	21	(Argentina) Julián Carranza	(United States) Philadelphia Union	Loan	
January 1, 2022	FW	29	(United States) Indiana Vassilev	(England) Aston Villa	End of Loan	
January 4, 2022	MF	10	(Mexico) Rodolfo Pizarro	(Mexico) Monterrey	Loan	
January 10, 2022	DF	26	(Argentina) Leandro González Pírez	(Argentina) River Plate	Loan	
January 10, 2022	DF	4	(Venezuela) Christian Makoun	(United States) Charlotte FC	Trade	
January 11, 2022	DF	17	(England) Ryan Shawcross	Retired	Mutual Agreement	
January 24, 2022	DF	5	(Argentina) Nicolás Figal	(Argentina) Boca Juniors	$2,600,000	
Summer 2022
June 10, 2022	MF	6	(England) Mo Adams	(Saudi Arabia) Al Shabab	Mutual Agreement	
July 13, 2022	FW	21	(Argentina) Julián Carranza	(United States) Philadelphia Union	$500,000 GAM	
July 15, 2022	MF	28	(Dominican Republic) Edison Azcona	(United States) El Paso Locomotive	Loan	
August 5, 2022	GK	94	(Senegal) Clement Diop	(United States) New England Revolution	$125,000 GAM	
August 16, 2022	DF	15	(Bolivia) Jairo Quinteros	(Spain) Real Zaragoza	Mutual Agreement	
August 19, 2022	MF	11	(Argentina) Matías Pellegrini	(United States) New York City FC	Waivers	

=== MLS SuperDraft ===
Round	No.	Player	Pos.	Team
1	9	(United States) Ryan Sailor	DF	University of Washington
2	36	(United States) Lucas Meek	MF	University of Washington
2	48	(United States) Justin Ingram	MF	Loyola University (MD)
2	54	(United States) Tyler Bagley	MF	Cornell University

== Non-competitive ==
=== Preseason ===
January 26 1	Inter Miami	4–0	Universitario	Fort Lauderdale, FL
17:00 EST	Cabanillas (o.g.); Fray; Neville; Hardin	Report		Stadium: DRV PNK Stadium; Attendance: 6,736

January 29 2	Inter Miami	0–1	D.C. United	Fort Lauderdale, FL
5:00 EST		Report	Hopkins 58'	Stadium: DRV PNK Stadium

February 4 3	Inter Miami	1–2	CF Montréal	Fort Lauderdale, FL
5:00 EST	Higuaín 40'	Report	Brisma 66', 90'	Stadium: Inter Miami Training Complex
Note: The match was played behind closed doors.

=== Carolina Challenge Cup ===
February 12 1	Inter Miami	1–1	Columbus Crew	Mount Pleasant, SC
1:00 p.m.	Lassiter 59'	Report	Etienne 86'	Stadium: Patriots Point Soccer Complex

February 15 2	Charleston Battery	0–1	Inter Miami	Mount Pleasant, SC
8:00 p.m.		Report	Lassiter 77'	Stadium: Patriots Point Soccer Complex

February 19 3	Inter Miami	2–1	Charlotte FC	Mount Pleasant, SC
8:00 p.m.	Campana 25'; Higuaín 50'	Report	Makoun 90+1' (pen.)	Stadium: Patriots Point Soccer Complex

=== Friendlies ===
July 19 Friendly	Inter Miami	0–6	Barcelona	Fort Lauderdale, FL
7:30 p.m.		Report	Aubameyang 19'; Raphinha 25'; Fati 41'; Gavi 55'; Depay 69'; Dembélé 70'	Stadium: DRV PNK Stadium; Attendance: 19,113; Referee: Rubiel Vazquez

== Competitive ==
=== Major League Soccer ===
==== Standings ====
===== Eastern Conference =====
Pos	Team	Pld	W	L	T	GF	GA	GD	Pts	Qualification
4	New York Red Bulls	34	15	11	8	50	41	+9	53	MLS Cup First Round
5	FC Cincinnati	34	12	9	13	64	56	+8	49	MLS Cup First Round
6	Inter Miami CF	34	14	14	6	47	56	−9	48	MLS Cup First Round
7	Orlando City SC	34	14	14	6	44	53	−9	48	MLS Cup First Round
8	Columbus Crew	34	10	8	16	46	41	+5	46	

Source: MLS
Rules for classification: 1) points; 2) total wins; 3) total goal differential; 4) total goals scored; 5) fewer disciplinary points; 6) away goal differential; 7) away goals scored; 8) home goals differential; 9) home goals scored; 10) coin toss (2 clubs tied) or drawing of lots (≥3 clubs tied)

===== Overall table =====
Pos	Team	Pld	W	L	T	GF	GA	GD	Pts	Qualification
10	FC Cincinnati	34	12	9	13	64	56	+8	49	
11	Minnesota United FC	34	14	14	6	48	51	−3	48	
12	Inter Miami CF	34	14	14	6	47	56	−9	48	
13	Orlando City SC	34	14	14	6	44	53	−9	48	CONCACAF Champions League
14	Real Salt Lake	34	12	11	11	43	45	−2	47	

Source: MLS
Rules for classification: 1) points; 2) total wins; 3) total goal differential; 4) total goals scored; 5) fewer disciplinary points; 6) away goal differential; 7) away goals scored; 8) home goals differential; 9) home goals scored; 10) coin toss (2 clubs tied) or drawing of lots (≥3 clubs tied)

==== Results summary ====
Overall								Home						Away					
Pld	Pts	W	L	T	GF	GA	GD	W	L	T	GF	GA	GD	W	L	T	GF	GA	GD
34	48	14	14	6	47	56	−9	10	4	3	34	28	+6	4	10	3	13	28	−15

Source: MLS
Pld = Matches played; Pts = Points; W = Matches won; T = Matches tied; L = Matches lost; GF = Goals for; GA = Goals against; GD = Goal difference

==== Results by round ====
Round	1	2	3	4	5	6	7	8	9	10	11	12	13	14	15	16	17	18	19	20	21	22	23	24	25	26	27	28	29	30	31	32	33	34
Stadium	H	A	H	A	H	H	A	H	A	A	H	A	H	H	A	H	A	A	H	H	A	H	A	A	H	H	A	A	A	H	A	A	H	H
Result	D	L	L	L	L	W	W	W	L	L	D	D	W	W	L	W	D	L	L	W	L	D	W	D	W	W	L	L	L	W	W	W	W	L

Source: IMCF schedule
A = Away; H = Home; W = Win; D = Draw; L = Loss

==== Match results ====
February 26 1	Inter Miami	0–0	Chicago Fire FC	Fort Lauderdale, FL
6:00 p.m. EST		Report		Stadium: DRV PNK Stadium; Attendance: 15,973; Referee: Lukasz Szpala

March 6 2	Austin FC	5–1	Inter Miami	Austin, TX
4:00 p.m. EST	Driussi 22', 51'; Cascante 26'; Finlay 64', 90'	Report	Campana 53'	Stadium: Q2 Stadium; Attendance: 20,738; Referee: Chris Penso

March 12 3	Inter Miami	0–2	Los Angeles FC	Fort Lauderdale, FL
1:30 p.m. EST	Shea (red card) 45+2'	Report	Opoku 45'; Tajouri-Shradi 82'	Stadium: DRV PNK Stadium; Attendance: 11,465; Referee: Ted Unkel

March 19 4	FC Cincinnati	3–1	Inter Miami	Cincinnati, OH
1:00 p.m. EDT	Matarrita 18'; Vazquez 24', 82'	Report	Higuaín 30' (pen.)	Stadium: TQL Stadium; Attendance: 19,365; Referee: Ismir Pekmic

April 2 5	Inter Miami	1–3	Houston Dynamo FC	Fort Lauderdale FL
9:50 p.m. EDT	Higuaín 66' (pen.)	Report	Quintero 49'; Picault 57' (pen.), 90+3'	Attendance: 13,083; Referee: Allen Chapman

April 9 6	Inter Miami	3–2	New England Revolution	Fort Lauderdale, FL
3:00 PM EDT	Campana 17', 23', 88'	Report	Rennicks 11'; Gil 67' (pen.)	Stadium: DRV PNK Stadium; Attendance: 11,472; Referee: Ramy Touchan
Note: The match was originally scheduled to kick-off at 5:00 PM EDT.

April 16 7	Seattle Sounders FC	0–1	Inter Miami	Seattle, WA
10:00 PM EDT		Report	Robinson 41'	Stadium: Lumen Field; Attendance: 32,126; Referee: Joseph Dickerson

April 24 8	Inter Miami	2–1	Atlanta United FC	Fort Lauderdale, FL
1:00 PM ET	Campana 28'; Duke 64'	Report	Cisneros 13'	Stadium: DRV PNK Stadium; Attendance: 13,433; Referee: Jair Marrufo

April 30 9	New England Revolution	2–0	Inter Miami	Foxborough, MA
7:30 PM EDT	Rivera 1'; Buksa 64'	Report	Lowe (yellow card) 54' (yellow-red card) 60'; Quinteros (yellow card) 55' (yellow-red card) 76'	Stadium: Gillette Stadium; Attendance: 25,509; Referee: Ismail Elfath

May 7 10	Charlotte FC	1–0	Inter Miami	Charlotte, NC
2:30 PM EDT	Shinyashiki 68'	Report		Stadium: Bank of America Stadium; Attendance: 32,018; Referee: Rubiel Vazquez

May 14 11	Inter Miami	2–2	D.C. United	Fort Lauderdale, FL
9:00 PM EDT	Campana 31'; Lowe 45'	Report	Fountas 45+3'; Durkin (yellow card) 69' (yellow-red card) 90+1'; Kamara 74'	Stadium: DRV PNK Stadium; Attendance: 13,317; Referee: Pierre-Luc Lauziere

May 18 12	Philadelphia Union	0–0	Inter Miami	Chester, PA
7:30 PM EDT		Report		Stadium: Subaru Park; Attendance: 15,747; Referee: Fotis Bazakos

May 22 13	Inter Miami	2–0	New York Red Bulls	Fort Lauderdale, FL
6:00 p.m. EDT	Lassiter 29'; Taylor 88'	Report		Stadium: DRV PNK Stadium; Attendance: 11,007; Referee: Jon Freemon

May 28 14	Inter Miami	2–1	Portland Timbers	Fort Lauderdale, FL
8:00 p.m. EDT	Campana 27'; Taylor 59'	Report	Tuiloma 78'	Stadium: DRV PNK Stadium; Attendance: 11,161; Referee: Chris Penso

June 19 15	Atlanta United FC	2–0	Inter Miami	Atlanta, GA
3:00 p.m. EDT	Araújo 4'; Martínez 61'	Report	Mota (yellow card) 25' (yellow-red card) 29'	Stadium: Mercedes-Benz Stadium; Attendance: 42,539; Referee: Armando Villarreal

June 25 16	Inter Miami	2–1	Minnesota United FC	Fort Lauderdale, FL
8:00 p.m. EDT	Vassilev 87', 90'	Report	Amarilla 65'	Stadium: DRV PNK Stadium; Attendance: 12,147; Referee: Victor Rivas

July 4 17	FC Dallas	1–1	Inter Miami	Frisco, TX
9:00 p.m. EDT	Velasco 27'	Report	Campana 89'	Stadium: Toyota Stadium; Attendance: 19,096; Referee: Alex Chilowicz

July 9 18	Orlando City SC	1–0	Inter Miami	Orlando, FL
8:00 p.m. EDT	Lowe 90+2' (o.g.)	Report		Stadium: Exploria Stadium; Attendance: 20,052; Referee: Nima Saghafi

July 13 19	Inter Miami	1–2	Philadelphia Union	Fort Lauderdale, FL
8:00 p.m. EDT	Higuaín 82'	Report	Gazdag 26' (pen.); Burke 66'	Stadium: DRV PNK Stadium; Attendance: 10,027; Referee: Marcos de Oliveira

July 16 20	Inter Miami	3–2	Charlotte FC	Fort Lauderdale, FL
8:00 p.m. EDT	Taylor 59'; Higuaín 72'; Rodríguez 90+3'	Report	Reyna 1', 42'	Stadium: DRV PNK Stadium; Attendance: 12,274; Referee: Jon Freemon

July 23 21	New York City FC	2–0	Inter Miami	New York, NY
7:00 p.m. EDT	Moralez 12'; Héber 75'	Report		Stadium: Yankee Stadium; Attendance: 23,277; Referee: Allen Chapman

July 30 22	Inter Miami	4–4	FC Cincinnati	Fort Lauderdale, FL
8:00 p.m. EDT	Higuaín 23', 37', 45+5' (pen.); McVey 90+7'	Report	Brenner 28', 40'; Vazquez 81', 86'	Stadium: DRV PNK Stadium; Attendance: 13,026; Referee: Tori Penso

August 3 23	San Jose Earthquakes	0–1	Inter Miami	San Jose, CA
10:30 p.m. EDT		Report	Mota 12'	Stadium: PayPal Park; Attendance: 11,806; Referee: Mark Allatin

August 6 24	CF Montréal	2–2	Inter Miami	Montréal, QC
7:30 p.m. EDT	Quioto 5', 21' (pen.)	Report	Higuaín 6'; Rodríguez 79'	Stadium: Saputo Stadium; Attendance: 18,007; Referee: Kevin Stott

August 13 25	Inter Miami	3–2	New York City FC	Fort Lauderdale, FL
8:00 p.m. EDT	Pozuelo 39', 84'; Lassiter 63'	Report	Magno 34'; Andrade 45+2'	Stadium: DRV PNK Stadium; Attendance: 11,419; Referee: Drew Fischer

August 20 26	Inter Miami	2–1	Toronto FC	Fort Lauderdale, FL
8:00 p.m. EDT	Mota 24'; Lassiter 44'	Report	Insigne 28'	Stadium: DRV PNK Stadium; Attendance: 14,388; Referee: Pierre-Luc Lauziere

August 27 27	New York Red Bulls	3–1	Inter Miami	Harrison, NJ
7:00 p.m. EDT	Duncan (yellow card) 36' (yellow-red card) 70'; Morgan 43'; Edelman 53'; Clark 74'	Report	Higuaín 19'; Pozuelo (red card) 29'	Stadium: Red Bull Arena; Attendance: 21,374; Referee: Fotis Bazakos

August 31 28	Columbus Crew	1–0	Inter Miami	Columbus, OH
7:30 p.m. EDT	Díaz 64'	Report		Stadium: Lower.com Field; Attendance: 18,034; Referee: Armando Villarreal

September 10 29	Chicago Fire FC	3–1	Inter Miami	Bridgeview, IL
8:00 PM EDT	Durán 40', 87'; Shaqiri 64'	Report	Higuaín 77' (pen.)	Stadium: SeatGeek Stadium; Attendance: 15,104; Referee: Matt Conger
Note: The match was originally scheduled to be played at Soldier Field.

September 13 30	Inter Miami	2–1	Columbus Crew	Fort Lauderdale, FL
8:00 p.m. EDT	Higuaín 25', 82'	Report	Hernández 41'	Stadium: DRV PNK Stadium; Attendance: 9,778; Referee: Jon Freemon

September 18 31	D.C. United	2–3	Inter Miami	Washington, D.C.
5:00 p.m. EDT	Benteke 22'; Fountas 57'	Report	Campana 39', 53'; Higuaín 90+4'	Stadium: Audi Field; Attendance: 14,284; Referee: Ismail Elfath

September 30 32	Toronto FC	0–1	Inter Miami	Toronto, ON
7:30 p.m. EDT		Report	Higuaín 86'	Stadium: BMO Field; Attendance: 27,703; Referee: Silviu Petrescu

October 5 33	Inter Miami	4–1	Orlando City SC	Fort Lauderdale, FL
8:00 p.m. EDT	Campana 1'; Higuaín 38', 52' (pen.); Lassiter 56'	Report	Kara 71'	Stadium: DRV PNK Stadium; Attendance: 15,228; Referee: Victor Rivas
Note: The match was originally scheduled for September 4.

October 9 34	Inter Miami	1–3	CF Montréal	Fort Lauderdale, FL
2:30 p.m. EDT	Waterman 85' (o.g.)	Report	Mihailovic 5'; Lappalainen 8'; Kamara 36'	Stadium: DRV PNK Stadium; Attendance: 15,635; Referee: Joseph Dickerson

=== MLS Cup Playoffs ===
October 17 First round	New York City FC	3–0	Inter Miami	New York, NY
7:00 p.m. EDT	Pereira 63'; Moralez 69'; Héber 90+2'	Report		Stadium: Citi Field; Attendance: 18,066; Referee: Rubiel Vazquez

=== U.S. Open Cup ===
April 19 Third round	Miami FC (USLC) (Florida)	0–1	(Florida) Inter Miami (MLS)	Miami, FL
7:00 pm EST		Report	Campana 83'; Lowe (red card) 90+4'	Stadium: Riccardo Silva Stadium; Attendance: 11,183; Referee: Alex Billeter

May 10 Round of 32	Inter Miami (MLS) (Florida)	3–1	(Georgia (U.S. state)) South Georgia Tormenta FC (USL1)	Fort Lauderdale, FL
8:00 pm EDT	Lassiter 45', 83'; Robinson 47' (red card) 65'	Report	Dengler (red card) 65'; Sterling 88'	Stadium: DRV PNK Stadium; Attendance: 3,198; Referee: Alejo Calume

May 25 Round of 16	Orlando City SC (MLS) (Florida)	1–1 (a.e.t.) (4–2 p)	(Florida) Inter Miami (MLS)	Orlando, FL
8:00 pm EDT	Torres 97'	Report	Mota 94'	Stadium: Exploria Stadium; Attendance: 11,509; Referee: Kevin Broadley
	Penalties
	Kara (penalty scored); Jansson (penalty scored); Perea (penalty scored); Pereyra (penalty scored)		(penalty scored) Campana; (penalty missed) Duke; (penalty missed) Yedlin; (penalty scored) Lassiter

== Statistics ==
=== Overall ===
Games played	34
Games won	14
Games drawn	6
Games lost	14
Goals scored	47
Goals conceded	56
Goal difference	-9
Clean sheets	6
Yellow cards	68
Red cards	5
Worst discipline	Damion Lowe
Best result(s)	4-1 (Orlando City SC)
Worst result(s)	5-1 (Austin FC)
Most appearances	Christopher McVey & DeAndre Yedlin
Top scorer	Gonzalo Higuaín
Points	48

Last updated: October 6, 2022
Source: IMCF Stats

=== Appearances and goals ===
No.	Pos.	Player	Nat.	Major League Soccer			MLS Cup Playoffs			U.S. Open Cup			Total		
No.	Pos.	Player	Nat.	Apps	Starts	Goals	Apps	Starts	Goals	Apps	Starts	Goals	Apps	Starts	Goals
21	GK	Nick Marsman	(Netherlands)	7	7	0	0	0	0	0	0	0	7	7	0
27	GK	Drake Callender	(United States)	24	24	0	1	1	0	3	3	0	28	28	0
~~94~~	GK	Clément Diop (Note: Player transferred out during the season)	(Senegal)	3	3	0	0	0	0	0	0	0	3	3	0
2	DF	DeAndre Yedlin	(United States)	34	33	0	1	1	0	3	1	0	38	35	0
3	DF	Kieran Gibbs	(England)	15	8	0	1	0	0	0	0	0	16	8	0
4	DF	Christopher McVey	(Sweden)	34	34	1	1	1	0	3	2	0	38	37	1
12	DF	Aimé Mabika	(Zambia)	15	13	0	1	1	0	2	2	0	18	16	0
~~15~~	DF	Jairo Quinteros	(Bolivia)	4	2	0	0	0	0	2	2	0	6	4	0
18	DF	Harvey Neville	(Republic of Ireland)	1	0	0	0	0	0	1	0	0	2	0	0
20	DF	Brek Shea	(United States)	4	2	0	0	0	0	0	0	0	4	2	0
31	DF	Damion Lowe	(Jamaica)	28	28	1	1	1	0	2	2	0	31	31	1
32	DF	Noah Allen	(United States)	8	3	0	0	0	0	2	1	0	10	4	0
33	DF	Joevin Jones	(Trinidad and Tobago)	8	0	0	0	0	0	2	1	0	10	1	0
45	DF	Ryan Sailor	(United States)	22	14	0	1	0	0	1	0	0	24	14	0
~~6~~	MF	Mo Adams	(England)	8	5	0	0	0	0	2	2	0	10	7	0
7	MF	Jean Mota	(Brazil)	33	33	2	1	1	0	2	1	1	36	35	3
8	MF	Alejandro Pozuelo	(Spain)	12	12	2	1	1	0	0	0	0	13	13	2
13	MF	Víctor Ulloa	(Mexico)	19	3	0	0	0	0	2	1	0	21	4	0
16	MF	Robert Taylor	(Finland)	33	26	3	1	1	0	3	3	0	37	30	3
22	MF	Bryce Duke	(United States)	28	16	1	1	0	0	3	1	0	32	17	1
25	MF	Emerson Rodríguez	(Colombia)	22	1	2	0	0	0	3	3	0	25	4	2
26	MF	Gregore	(Brazil)	30	30	0	1	1	0	2	2	0	33	33	0
28	MF	Edison Azcona	(Dominican Republic)	1	0	0	0	0	0	0	0	0	1	0	0
30	MF	George Acosta	(United States)	1	0	0	0	0	0	0	0	0	1	0	0
9	FW	Leonardo Campana	(Ecuador)	26	21	11	0	0	0	2	1	1	28	22	12
10	FW	Gonzalo Higuaín	(Argentina)	28	20	16	1	1	0	2	2	0	31	23	16
11	FW	Ariel Lassiter	(Costa Rica)	30	17	4	1	1	0	3	1	2	34	19	6
14	FW	Corentin Jean	(France)	3	0	0	0	0	0	0	0	0	3	0	0
17	FW	Indiana Vassilev	(United States)	24	13	2	1	0	0	2	2	0	27	15	2
19	FW	Robbie Robinson	(United States)	8	6	1	0	0	0	2	0	1	10	6	2
Total				34		46	1		0	3		5	38		51

=== Top scorers ===
Rank	Pos.	No.	Name	MLS	MLS Cup	USOC	Total
1	FW	10	(Argentina) Gonzalo Higuaín	16	0	0	16
2	FW	9	(Ecuador) Leonardo Campana	11	0	1	12
3	FW	11	(Costa Rica) Ariel Lassiter	4	0	2	6
4	MF	16	(Finland) Robert Taylor	3	0	0	3
4	MF	7	(Brazil) Jean Mota	2	0	1	3
6	MF	8	(Spain) Alejandro Pozuelo	2	0	0	2
6	FW	17	(United States) Indiana Vassilev	2	0	0	2
6	MF	25	(Colombia) Emerson Rodriguez	2	0	0	2
6	FW	19	(United States) Robbie Robinson	1	0	1	2
10	DF	4	(Sweden) Christopher McVey	1	0	0	1
10	MF	22	(United States) Bryce Duke	1	0	0	1
10	DF	31	(Jamaica) Damion Lowe	1	0	0	1
Total				46	0	5	51

=== Top assists ===
Rank	Pos.	No.	Name	MLS	MLS Cup	USOC	Total
1	MF	22	(United States) Bryce Duke	7	0	0	7
2	MF	8	(Spain) Alejandro Pozuelo	6	0	0	6
3	FW	11	(Costa Rica) Ariel Lassiter	5	0	0	5
3	MF	16	(Finland) Robert Taylor	3	0	2	5
5	DF	2	(United States) DeAndre Yedlin	4	0	0	4
5	FW	17	(United States) Indiana Vassilev	2	0	2	4
7	MF	7	(Brazil) Jean Mota	3	0	0	3
7	FW	10	(Argentina) Gonzalo Higuaín	3	0	0	3
7	MF	26	(Brazil) Gregore	3	0	0	3
10	FW	9	(Ecuador) Leonardo Campana	2	0	0	2
11	DF	4	(Sweden) Christopher McVey	1	0	0	1
11	DF	12	(Zambia) Aimé Mabika	1	0	0	1
11	MF	13	(United States) Victor Ulloa	1	0	0	1
11	FW	14	(France) Corentin Jean	1	0	0	1
11	FW	19	(United States) Robbie Robinson	1	0	0	1
11	DF	31	(Jamaica) Damion Lowe	1	0	0	1
11	DF	33	(Trinidad and Tobago) Joevin Jones	0	0	1	1
Total				44	0	5	49

=== Disciplinary record ===
No.	Pos.	Player	MLS			MLS Cup			USOC			Total		
No.	Pos.	Player	Booked	(yellow card) (yellow-red card)	Sent off (straight red)	Booked	(yellow card) (yellow-red card)	Sent off (straight red)	Booked	(yellow card) (yellow-red card)	Sent off (straight red)	Booked	(yellow card) (yellow-red card)	Sent off (straight red)
2	DF	(United States) DeAndre Yedlin	6	0	0	0	0	0	1	0	0	7	0	0
4	DF	(Sweden) Christopher McVey	4	0	0	0	0	0	1	0	0	5	0	0
6	MF	(England) Mo Adams	3	0	0	0	0	0	2	0	0	5	0	0
7	MF	(Brazil) Jean Mota	4	1	0	0	0	0	0	0	0	4	1	0
8	MF	(Spain) Alejandro Pozuelo	1	0	1	1	0	0	0	0	0	2	0	1
9	FW	(Ecuador) Leonardo Campana	2	0	0	0	0	0	0	0	0	2	0	0
10	FW	(Argentina) Gonzalo Higuaín	2	0	0	0	0	0	0	0	0	2	0	0
11	FW	(Costa Rica) Ariel Lassiter	2	0	0	1	0	0	0	0	0	3	0	0
12	DF	(Zambia) Aimé Mabika	1	0	0	0	0	0	0	0	0	1	0	0
15	DF	(Bolivia) Jairo Quinteros	1	1	0	0	0	0	1	0	0	2	1	0
16	MF	(Finland) Robert Taylor	2	0	0	0	0	0	0	0	0	2	0	0
17	FW	(United States) Indiana Vassilev	3	0	0	0	0	0	0	0	0	3	0	0
19	FW	(United States) Robbie Robinson	0	0	0	0	0	0	0	0	1	0	0	1
20	DF	(United States) Brek Shea	0	0	1	0	0	0	0	0	0	0	0	1
21	GK	(Netherlands) Nick Marsman	2	0	0	0	0	0	0	0	0	2	0	0
22	MF	(United States) Bryce Duke	5	0	0	0	0	0	1	0	0	6	0	0
25	MF	(Colombia) Emerson Rodríguez	2	0	0	0	0	0	1	0	0	3	0	0
26	MF	(Brazil) Gregore	12	0	0	0	0	0	2	0	0	14	0	0
27	GK	(United States) Drake Callender	1	0	0	0	0	0	0	0	0	1	0	0
28	MF	(Dominican Republic) Edison Azcona	1	0	0	0	0	0	0	0	0	1	0	0
31	DF	(Jamaica) Damion Lowe	8	1	0	1	0	0	2	1	0	11	2	0
32	DF	(United States) Noah Allen	0	0	0	0	0	0	1	0	0	1	0	0
45	DF	(United States) Ryan Sailor	1	0	0	0	0	0	0	0	0	1	0	0
Total			63	3	2	3	0	0	12	1	1	78	4	3

=== Clean sheets ===
No.	Name	MLS	MLS Cup	USOC	Total	Games
27	(United States) Drake Callender	4	0	1	5	27
21	(Netherlands) Nick Marsman	1	0	0	1	7
94	(Senegal) Clément Diop	1	0	0	1	3
