= List of Inter Miami CF seasons =

Since its inaugural 2020 season, the American soccer club Inter Miami CF has competed in Major League Soccer.

== Key ==
Key to competitions

- Major League Soccer (MLS) – The top-flight of soccer in the United States, established in 1996.
- MLS Cup Playoffs - The annual postseason elimination tournament from MLS determining the winner of the MLS season.
- U.S. Open Cup (USOC) – The premier knockout cup competition in U.S. soccer, first contested in 1914.
- CONCACAF Champions League (CCL) – The premier competition in North American soccer since 1962. It went by the name of Champions' Cup until 2008.
- Leagues Cup - An annual association soccer tournament that combines both leagues MLS and Liga MX. Debuted in 2019, although not an official tournament until it was recognized by CONCACAF in 2023.

Key to colors and symbols

1st or W	Winners
2nd or RU	Runners-up
3rd	Third place
Last	Wooden Spoon
♦	MLS Golden Boot
	Highest average attendance
Italics	Ongoing competition

Key to league record

- Season = The year and article of the season
- Div = Division/level on pyramid
- League = League name
- Pld = Games played
- W = Games won
- L = Games lost
- D = Games drawn
- GF = Goals for
- GA = Goals against
- GD = Goal difference
- Pts = Points
- PPG = Points per game
- Conf. = Conference position
- Overall = League position

Key to cup record

- DNE = Did not enter
- DNQ = Did not qualify
- NH = Competition not held or canceled
- Q = Qualified for the cup
- QR = Qualifying round
- PR = Preliminary round
- GS = Group stage
- R1 = First round
- R2 = Second round
- R3 = Third round
- R4 = Fourth round
- R5 = Fifth round
- Ro16 = Round of 16
- QF = Quarterfinals
- SF = Semifinals
- F = Final
- RU = Runners-up
- W = Winners

== Seasons ==
Season	League										Position		Playoffs	USOC	Continental / Other		Average attendance (Note: Average attendance only includes statistics from regular season matches.)	Top goalscorer(s) (Note: Top goalscorer(s) includes all goals scored in the regular season, MLS Cup Playoffs, U.S. Open Cup, MLS is Back Tournament, CONCACAF Champions League, FIFA Club World Cup, and other competitive continental matches.)	
Season	League	Pld	W	L	D	GF	GA	GD	Pts	PPG	Conf.	Overall	Playoffs	USOC	Continental / Other		Average attendance	Name(s)	Goals
2020	MLS	23	7	13	3	25	35	–10	24	1.04	10th	19th	PR	NH	MLS is Back Tournament	GS	2,216	(Scotland) Lewis Morgan	5
2021	MLS	34	12	17	5	36	53	–17	41	1.21	11th	20th	–	NH			14,713	(Argentina) Gonzalo Higuaín	12
2022	MLS	34	14	14	6	47	56	–9	48	1.41	6th	12th	R1	Ro16			12,613	(Argentina) Gonzalo Higuaín	16
2023	MLS	34	9	18	7	41	54	–13	34	1.00	14th	27th	–	RU	Leagues Cup	W	17,698	(Venezuela) Josef Martínez	12
2024	MLS	34	22	4	8	79	49	30	74	2.18	1st	1st	R1	DNE	CONCACAF Champions Cup Leagues Cup	QF Ro16	21,245	(Uruguay) Luis Suárez	25
2025	MLS	34	19	7	8	81	55	26	65	1.91	3rd	3rd	W	DNE	CONCACAF Champions Cup FIFA Club World Cup Leagues Cup	SF Ro16 RU	20,746	(Argentina) Lionel Messi	43
Total		193	83	73	37	309	302	7	286	1.48	—	—	—	—	—		—	(Argentina) Lionel Messi	77
