= Juan Manuel Fedorco =

Argentine footballer

Personal information
- Full name: Juan Manuel Fedorco
- Date of birth: 28 November 2000 (age 25)
- Place of birth: Carmen de Patagones, Buenos Aires, Argentina
- Height: 1.85 m (6 ft 1 in)
- Position: Centre-back

Team information
- Current team: Independiente
- Number: 13

Youth career
- Deportivo Patagones
- Olimpo

Senior career*
Years	Team	Apps	(Gls)
2019–2021	Sol de Mayo	21	(0)
2021–2022	Douglas Haig	9	(0)
2022	San Jorge	12	(0)
2022–2023	Independiente Chivilcoy	32	(0)
2023–2024	Nueva Chicago	30	(3)
2024–	Independiente	34	(1)
2025	→ Puebla (loan)	22	(0)
- * Club domestic league appearances and goals as of 17:44, 6 June 2026 (UTC)

Juan Manuel Fedorco (born 28 November 2000) is an Argentine footballer who plays as a centre-back for Independiente.

== Career ==
Fedorco started his youth career with Deportivo Patagones, prior to moving to the academy of Olimpo.

He made his professional debut at Sol de Mayo in the Torneo Federal A, the third tier of Argentine domestic football, where he spent 3 years, before short spells at Douglas Haig, San Jorge Tucumán and Independiente Chivilcoy. He then moved to the Primera Nacional to join Nueva Chicago, where he spent a season. After impressing for Nueva Chicago, he again moved up a division to Argentine Primera División side Independiente, coached by Carlos Tevez, signing a four-year contract. He made his debut on 8 February 2024, with his side keeping a clean sheet in a 0–0 draw against Huracán. In February 2025, he moved abroad for the first time in his career as he joined Liga MX club Puebla on a one-year loan. On 7 August 2025, he scored his first goal for the club in a 3–0 win against New York City FC in the Leagues Cup.
