= Miguel García (footballer, born 2001) =

Mexican footballer (born 2001)

Personal information
- Full name: Miguel Alonso García Álvarez
- Date of birth: 14 October 2001 (age 25)
- Place of birth: Los Cabos, Baja California Sur, Mexico
- Height: 1.88 m (6 ft 2 in)
- Position: Midfielder

Team information
- Current team: Atlético San Luis
- Number: 14

Youth career
- 2019: UANL

Senior career*
Years	Team	Apps	(Gls)
2022–2024	Venados	76	(6)
2025–	Atlético San Luis	52	(1)
- * Club domestic league appearances and goals as of 17 October 2026

Miguel Alonso García Álvarez (born 14 October 2001), also known as Chano, is a Mexican professional footballer who plays as a midfielder for Liga MX club Atlético San Luis.

== Club career ==
=== Venados ===
García began his career in 2016 with Guerreros Pericúes, retaking his career five years later with Venados, starting with their affiliate Progreso. In the summer of 2022, he joined Venados, making his professional debut on 21 July in a 1–1 draw with Durango, where he was subbed in at the 61st minute.

=== Atlético San Luis ===
On 27 December 2024, García signed with Atlético San Luis, making his debut on 18 January 2025, in a 2–1 win against Puebla, playing 83 minutes.

== Career statistics ==
=== Club ===
As of match played on 17 October 2026

Appearances and goals by club, season and competition
Club	Season	League			Cup		Continental		Intercontinental		Other		Total	
Club	Season	Division	Apps	Goals	Apps	Goals	Apps	Goals	Apps	Goals	Apps	Goals	Apps	Goals
Venados (loan)	2022–23	Liga de Expansión MX	28	1	—		—		—		—		28	1
Venados (loan)	2023–24	Liga de Expansión MX	33	5	—		—		—		—		33	5
Venados (loan)	2024–25	Liga de Expansión MX	15	0	—		—		—		—		15	0
Venados (loan)	Total		76	6	—		—		—		—		76	6
Atlético San Luis	2024–25	Liga MX	13	0	—		—		—		—		13	0
Atlético San Luis	2025–26	Liga MX	32	1	—		—		—		3 (Note: Appearances in Leagues Cup)	1	35	2
Atlético San Luis	2026–27	Liga MX	8	0	—		—		—		3	0	11	0
Atlético San Luis	Total		53	1	—		—		—		6	1	59	2
Career total			129	7	0	0	0	0	0	0	6	1	134	8
