= 2025 Leagues Cup knockout stage =

Second and final stage of soccer tournament

The knockout stage of the 2025 Leagues Cup was the second and final stage of the competition, following the league phase. The knockout stage began on August 20 and concluded with the final on August 31. The top 4 teams from each standings advanced to the knockout stage to compete in a single-elimination tournament. There were 8 matches in the knockout stage, including a third-place playoff played between the two losing semifinalists.

== Format ==
The knockout stage of the 2025 Leagues Cup was contested between four teams from Liga MX and four teams from Major League Soccer (MLS). Out of all 36 teams that competed in this tournament, only eight teams advanced to the next round, four from each league. Matches in the knockout stage were played to a finish. If the score of a match is leveled at the end of 90 minutes, no extra time was played, and the match will decided by a penalty shoot-out.

== Qualified teams ==
The top four teams from each league qualified for the knockout stage.

=== Liga MX ===
Pos	Team	Pld	W	PW	PL	L	GF	GA	GD	Pts	Qualification
1	Toluca	3	2	1	0	0	6	4	+2	8	Advance to knockout stage
2	Pachuca	3	2	0	1	0	6	4	+2	7	Advance to knockout stage
3	Tigres UANL	3	2	0	0	1	7	4	+3	6	Advance to knockout stage
4	Puebla	3	2	0	0	1	6	4	+2	6	Advance to knockout stage

Source: Leagues Cup

=== Major League Soccer ===
Pos	Team	Pld	W	PW	PL	L	GF	GA	GD	Pts	Qualification
1	Seattle Sounders FC	3	3	0	0	0	11	2	+9	9	Advance to knockout stage
2	Inter Miami CF	3	2	1	0	0	7	4	+3	8	Advance to knockout stage
3	LA Galaxy	3	2	0	1	0	10	3	+7	7	Advance to knockout stage
4	Orlando City SC	3	2	0	1	0	9	3	+6	7	Advance to knockout stage

Source: Leagues Cup

== Bracket ==
The tournament bracket is shown below, with bold denoting the winners of each match.

Times are EDT (UTC−4), as listed by CONCACAF (local times, if different, are in parentheses).

Quarterfinals
August 20 – Seattle
**(United States) Seattle Sounders FC (p)**	**0 (4)**
(Mexico) Puebla	0 (3)
August 20 – Carson
**(United States) LA Galaxy**	**2**
(Mexico) Pachuca	1
August 20 – Carson
(Mexico) Toluca	0 (5)
**(United States) Orlando City SC (p)**	**0 (6)**
August 20 – Fort Lauderdale
**(United States) Inter Miami CF**	**2**
(Mexico) Tigres UANL	1

Semifinals
August 27 – Carson
**(United States) Seattle Sounders FC**	**2**
(United States) LA Galaxy	0
August 27 – Fort Lauderdale
(United States) Orlando City SC	1
**(United States) Inter Miami CF**	**3**

Final
August 31 – Seattle
**(United States) Seattle Sounders FC**	**3**
(United States) Inter Miami CF	0
Third place playoff
August 31 – Carson
**(United States) LA Galaxy**	**2**
(United States) Orlando City SC	1

== Quarterfinals ==
=== Summary ===
Quarterfinals
Team 1	Score	Team 2
Inter Miami CF (United States)	2–1	(Mexico) Tigres UANL
Toluca (Mexico)	0–0 (5–6 p)	(United States) Orlando City SC
Seattle Sounders FC (United States)	0–0 (4–3 p)	(Mexico) Puebla
LA Galaxy (United States)	2–1	(Mexico) Pachuca

=== Matches ===
August 20, 2025
20:00

Inter Miami CF (United States)	2–1	(Mexico) Tigres UANL
Suárez 23' (pen.), 89' (pen.)	Report	Correa 67'

Chase Stadium, Fort Lauderdale, Florida
Attendance: 18,597
Referee: Mario Escobar (Guatemala)

August 20, 2025
21:00 (18:00 UTC−7)

Toluca (Mexico)	0–0	(United States) Orlando City SC
	Report
Penalties
Vega (penalty scored); Pereira (penalty scored); Morales (penalty scored); Gallardo (penalty scored); Romero (penalty scored); Castro (penalty missed); Domínguez (penalty missed)	5–6	(penalty scored) Ojeda; (penalty scored) Jansson; (penalty scored) Freeman; (penalty scored) Gerbet; (penalty scored) Smith; (penalty missed) Enrique; (penalty scored) Gallese

Dignity Health Sports Park, Carson, California
Attendance: 16,559
Referee: Saíd Martínez (Honduras)

August 20, 2025
23:00 (20:00 UTC−7)

Seattle Sounders FC (United States)	0–0	(Mexico) Puebla
	Report
Penalties
C. Roldan (penalty missed); A. Roldán (penalty scored); Ragen (penalty scored); Ferreira (penalty scored); Vargas (penalty scored)	4–3	(penalty missed) Marín; (penalty scored) Lozano; (penalty scored) O. González; (penalty scored) Monárrez; (penalty missed) Díaz

Lumen Field, Seattle, Washington
Attendance: 18,362
Referee: Juan Gabriel Calderón (Costa Rica)

August 20, 2025
23:45 (20:45 UTC−7)

LA Galaxy (United States)	2–1	(Mexico) Pachuca
Aceves 27' (o.g.); Reus 37'	Report	Alemão 90+6'

Dignity Health Sports Park, Carson, California
Attendance: 16,559
Referee: Oshane Nation (Jamaica)

== Semifinals ==
=== Summary ===
Semifinals
Team 1	Score	Team 2
Inter Miami CF (United States)	3–1	(United States) Orlando City SC
LA Galaxy (United States)	0–2	(United States) Seattle Sounders FC

=== Matches ===
August 27, 2025
20:30

Inter Miami CF (United States)	3–1	(United States) Orlando City SC
Messi 77' (pen.), 88'; Segovia 90+1'	Report	Pašalić 45+1'

Chase Stadium, Fort Lauderdale, Florida
Attendance: 17,878
Referee: Walter López (Guatemala)

August 27, 2025
22:45 (19:45 UTC−7)

LA Galaxy (United States)	0–2	(United States) Seattle Sounders FC
	Report	De la Vega 7'; De Rosario 57'

Dignity Health Sports Park, Carson, California
Attendance: 11,609
Referee: Adonai Escobedo (Mexico)

== Third place playoff ==
The winners of the third place playoff qualified for the first round of the 2026 CONCACAF Champions Cup.

=== Summary ===
Third place playoff
Team 1	Score	Team 2
LA Galaxy (United States)	2–1	(United States) Orlando City SC

=== Matches ===
August 31, 2025
17:00 (14:00 UTC−7)

LA Galaxy (United States)	2–1	(United States) Orlando City SC
Reus 9'; Paintsil 67'	Report	Ojeda 60'

Dignity Health Sports Park, Carson, California
Attendance: 12,129
Referee: Pierre-Luc Lauzière (Canada)

== Final ==
Both clubs that made the final qualified for the 2026 CONCACAF Champions Cup, with the winners qualifying directly to the round of 16.

August 31, 2025
5:00 p.m. PDT

Seattle Sounders FC (United States)	3–0	(United States) Inter Miami CF
De Rosario 26'; A. Roldán 84' (pen.); Rothrock 89'	Report

Lumen Field, Seattle, Washington
Attendance: 69,314
Referee: Juan Gabriel Calderón (Costa Rica)
