= 2003 Peace Cup =

Tournament details
- Country: South Korea
- Venues: 6 (in 6 host cities)
- Dates: 15–22 July 2003
- Teams: 8

Final positions
- Champions: (Netherlands) PSV Eindhoven (1st title)

Tournament statistics
- Matches played: 13
- Goals scored: 31 (2.38 per match)
- Top goal scorer(s): 5 players (2 goals each)

Awards
- Best player: Park Ji-sung (PSV Eindhoven)

The 2003 Peace Cup was the first competition of the Peace Cup. The eight invited teams were split into two groups, and two group winners advanced to the final. Champions PSV Eindhoven earned $2 million in prize money.

== Teams ==
Team	League
(Germany) 1860 Munich	2003–04 Bundesliga
(Turkey) Beşiktaş	2003–04 Süper Lig
(South Africa) Kaizer Chiefs	2003–04 Premier Soccer League
(United States) LA Galaxy	2003 Major League Soccer
(France) Lyon	2003–04 Ligue 1
(Uruguay) Nacional	2003 Uruguayan Primera División
(Netherlands) PSV Eindhoven	2003–04 Eredivisie
(South Korea) Seongnam Ilhwa Chunma	2003 K League

== Venues ==
Seoul	Suwon	Daejeon
Seoul World Cup Stadium	Suwon World Cup Stadium	Daejeon World Cup Stadium
Capacity: 66,806	Capacity: 43,959	Capacity: 40,535
2003 Peace Cup is located in South Korea
Busan	Ulsan	Jeonju
Busan Asiad Main Stadium	Ulsan Munsu Football Stadium	Jeonju World Cup Stadium
Capacity: 53,864	Capacity: 44,474	Capacity: 42,477

== Group stage ==
=== Group A ===
Team	Pld	W	D	L	GF	GA	GD	Pts
(France) Lyon	3	2	0	1	4	2	+2	6
(South Korea) Seongnam Ilhwa Chunma	3	2	0	1	3	2	+1	6
(Turkey) Beşiktaş	3	1	1	1	5	5	0	4
(South Africa) Kaizer Chiefs	3	0	1	2	2	5	–3	1

15 July 2003

Seongnam Ilhwa Chunma	2–1	Beşiktaş
Drakulić 7'; Kim Dae-eui 90+2'		Kaloğlu 5'

Seoul World Cup Stadium, Seoul

15 July 2003

Kaizer Chiefs	0–2	Lyon
		Bergougnoux 3', 14'

Daejeon World Cup Stadium, Daejeon

17 July 2003

Seongnam Ilhwa Chunma	1–0	Kaizer Chiefs
Kim Do-hoon 18'

Suwon World Cup Stadium, Suwon

17 July 2003

Lyon	1–2	Beşiktaş
Luyindula 74'		Pancu 46'; Ahmet 86'

Ulsan Munsu Football Stadium, Ulsan

19 July 2003

Beşiktaş	2–2	Kaizer Chiefs
Guiaro 52'; Yalçın 65'		Musasa 57'; Moshoeu 72'

Busan Asiad Main Stadium, Busan

19 July 2003

Lyon	1–0	Seongnam Ilhwa Chunma
Govou 7'

Jeonju World Cup Stadium, Jeonju

=== Group B ===
Team	Pld	W	D	L	GF	GA	GD	Pts
(Netherlands) PSV Eindhoven	3	2	0	1	9	6	+3	6
(Uruguay) Nacional	3	1	1	1	3	2	+1	4
(Germany) 1860 Munich	3	1	1	1	3	4	–1	4
(United States) LA Galaxy	3	0	2	1	1	4	–3	2

16 July 2003

1860 Munich	2–4	PSV Eindhoven
Schroth 9'; Kioyo 80'		Park Ji-sung 49'; Kežman 62'; Ooijer 88'; Robben 90+3'

Busan Asiad Main Stadium, Busan

16 July 2003

LA Galaxy	0–0	Nacional

Jeonju World Cup Stadium, Jeonju

18 July 2003

Nacional	3–1	PSV Eindhoven
Scotti 29'; Munua 42' (pen.); Eguren 90'		Robben 28'

Seoul World Cup Stadium, Seoul

18 July 2003

1860 Munich	0–0	LA Galaxy

Daejeon World Cup Stadium, Daejeon

20 July 2003

PSV Eindhoven	4–1	LA Galaxy
Park Ji-sung 2'; Vennegoor 5'; De Jong 56'; Van Bommel 79'		Chacón 16'

Suwon World Cup Stadium, Suwon

20 July 2003

Nacional	0–1	1860 Munich
		Schroth 66'

Ulsan Munsu Football Stadium, Ulsan

== Final ==
22 July 2003

PSV Eindhoven	1–0	Lyon
Van Bommel 23' (pen.)

Seoul World Cup Stadium, Seoul

== Goalscorers ==
2 goals

- (Germany) Markus Schroth (1860 Munich)
- (France) Bryan Bergougnoux (Lyon)
- (South Korea) Park Ji-sung (PSV Eindhoven)
- (Netherlands) Mark van Bommel (PSV Eindhoven)
- (Netherlands) Arjen Robben (PSV Eindhoven)

1 goal

- (Brazil) Ronaldo Guiaro (Beşiktaş)
- (Democratic Republic of the Congo) Kabamba Musasa (Kaizer Chiefs)
- (France) Sidney Govou (Lyon)
- (France) Péguy Luyindula (Lyon)
- (Germany) Francis Kioyo (1860 Munich)
- (Honduras) Alex Pineda Chacón (LA Galaxy)
- (South Korea) Kim Dae-eui (Seongnam Ilhwa Chunma)
- (South Korea) Kim Do-hoon (Seongnam Ilhwa Chunma)
- (Netherlands) John de Jong (PSV Eindhoven)
- (Netherlands) André Ooijer (PSV Eindhoven)
- (Netherlands) Jan Vennegoor of Hesselink (PSV Eindhoven)
- (Romania) Daniel Pancu (Beşiktaş)
- (Serbia and Montenegro) Saša Drakulić (Seongnam Ilhwa Chunma)
- (Serbia and Montenegro) Mateja Kežman (PSV Eindhoven)
- (South Africa) John Moshoeu (Kaizer Chiefs)
- (Turkey) Sinan Kaloğlu (Beşiktaş)
- (Turkey) Ahmet Yıldırım (Beşiktaş)
- (Turkey) Sergen Yalçın (Beşiktaş)
- (Uruguay) Diego Scotti (Nacional)
- (Uruguay) Gustavo Munúa (Nacional)
- (Uruguay) Sebastián Eguren (Nacional)
