= Emerson Rodríguez (footballer) =

Colombian footballer (born 2000)

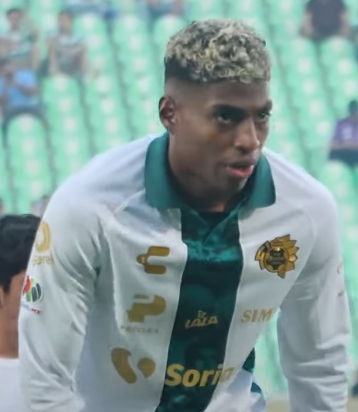
- Rodriguez with Santos Laguna in 2023

Personal information
- Full name: Emerson Rivaldo Rodríguez Valois
- Date of birth: 25 August 2000 (age 26)
- Place of birth: Buenaventura, Colombia
- Height: 1.74 m (5 ft 9 in)
- Position: Winger

Team information
- Current team: Santa Fe
- Number: 25

Youth career
- –2019: Millonarios

Senior career*
Years	Team	Apps	(Gls)
2019–2022	Millonarios	54	(8)
2019	→ Valledupar (loan)	8	(0)
2022–2025	Inter Miami	22	(2)
2022	Inter Miami II	3	(3)
2023	→ Santos Laguna (loan)	29	(2)
2024	→ Millonarios (loan)	16	(2)
2024	→ Vasco da Gama (loan)	15	(2)
2025–	Ludogorets Razgrad II	10	(2)
2025–	Ludogorets Razgrad	16	(2)
2026	→ Botev Plovdiv (loan)	11	(0)
2026–	→ Santa Fe (loan)	0	(0)
- * Club domestic league appearances and goals as of 8 September 2026

Emerson Rivaldo Rodríguez Valois (born 25 August 2000) is a Colombian professional footballer who plays as a winger for Independiente Santa Fe, on loan from Bulgarian First League club Ludogorets Razgrad.

== Club career ==
Rodríguez started his youth career with Millonarios. On 6 August 2019, he joined Valledupar on loan for the second half of the 2019 season. In October 2020 he debuted for Millonarios and scored his first goal against Atlético Nacional on November 1, in a 3–0 victory.

On 19 January 2022, Rodríguez joined MLS club Inter Miami, signing a three-year contract. He started the season playing for Inter Miami II, where he scored three goals in three matches, including the opener in a 2–0 victory against Orlando City B.

On 27 January 2023, Rodríguez was loaned to Liga MX side Santos Laguna, until the end of 2023. In January 2024, he was in negotiations to extend with Santos for the second half of the season, but ultimately returned to Colombia, rejoining Millonarios on loan until 30 June 2024. On 16 July 2024, he joined Brazilian Série A club Vasco da Gama on loan through July 2025, with an option of joining permanently.

On January 25, 2025, Emerson Rodriguez signed a contract with Ludogorets Razgrad.

== Career statistics ==
=== Club ===
As of 19 December 2024

Appearances and goals by club, season and competition
Club	Season	League			Cup (Note: Includes Copa Colombia, U.S. Open Cup and Copa do Brasil)		Continental (Note: Includes Copa Sudamericana and Copa Libertadores)		Other (Note: Includes Leagues Cup)		Total	
Club	Season	Division	Apps	Goals	Apps	Goals	Apps	Goals	Apps	Goals	Apps	Goals
Valledupar (loan)	2019	Categoría Primera B	8	0	0	0	—		—		8	0
Millonarios	2020	Categoría Primera A	15	3	1	0	2	0	—		18	3
Millonarios	2021	Categoría Primera A	39	5	0	0	—		—		39	5
Millonarios	Total		57	8	1	0	2	0	0	0	60	6
Inter Miami	2022	MLS	22	2	3	0	—		—		25	2
Inter Miami II	2022	MLS Next Pro	3	3	—		—		—		3	3
Santos Laguna (loan)	2022–23	Liga MX	10	0	—		—		—		10	0
Santos Laguna (loan)	2023–24	Liga MX	19	2	—		—		2	0	21	2
Santos Laguna (loan)			29	2	0	0	0	0	2	0	31	2
Millonarios (loan)	2024	Categoría Primera A	16	2	0	0	6	0	—		22	2
Vasco da Gama (loan)	2024	Série A	15	2	6	0	—		—		21	2
Career total			150	19	7	0	8	0	2	0	49	6
