= Owen González =

Mexican footballer (born 2003)

Personal information
- Full name: Owen de Jesús González Ojeda
- Date of birth: 20 July 2003 (age 23)
- Place of birth: Concepción del Oro, Zacatecas, Mexico
- Height: 1.69 m (5 ft 7 in)
- Position: Attacking midfielder

Team information
- Current team: Necaxa (on loan from Pachuca)
- Number: 13

Youth career
- 2019–2020: Zacatecas
- 2020–2025: Pachuca

Senior career*
Years	Team	Apps	(Gls)
2023–	Pachuca	34	(2)
2025–2026	→ Puebla (loan)	18	(1)
2026–	→ Necaxa (loan)	11	(3)
- * Club domestic league appearances and goals as of 6 November 2026

Owen de Jesús González Ojeda (born 20 July 2003), is a Mexican professional footballer who plays as an attacking midfielder for Liga MX club Necaxa, on loan from Pachuca.

== Club career ==
González began his career at the academy of Zacatecas, before moving to Pachuca where he made his professional debut on 21 August 2023 in a 1–1 draw with Querétaro, where he was subbed in at the 62nd minute and on 21 April 2024, he scored his first goal in a 2–0 win against Santos Laguna.

On 12 June 2025, González was loaned to Puebla, making his debut on 12 July.

On 28 July 2026, González was loaned to Necaxa.

== Career statistics ==
=== Club ===
As of match played on 6 November 2026

Appearances and goals by club, season and competition
Club	Season	League			Cup		Continental		Other		Total	
Club	Season	Division	Apps	Goals	Apps	Goals	Apps	Goals	Apps	Goals	Apps	Goals
Pachuca	2023–24	Liga MX	12	1	—		2 (Note: Appearances in CONCACAF Champions Cup)	0	—		14	1
Pachuca	2024–25	Liga MX	22	1	—		—		3 (Note: Appearances in Leagues Cup)	0	25	1
Pachuca	Total		34	2	—		2	0	3	0	39	2
Puebla (loan)	2025–26	Liga MX	18	1	—		—		4	0	22	1
Necaxa (loan)	2026–27	Liga MX	11	3	—		—		3	0	14	3
Career total			63	56	0	0	2	0	10	0	75	6
