= Jairo Quinteros =

Bolivian footballer (born 2001)

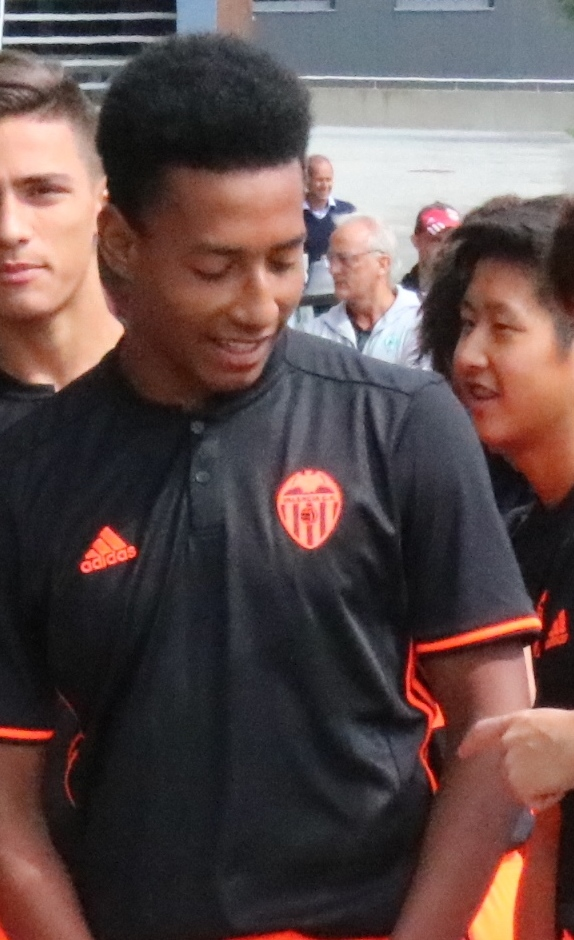

Personal information
- Full name: Jairo Quinteros Sierra
- Date of birth: 7 February 2001 (age 25)
- Place of birth: Santa Cruz, Bolivia
- Height: 5 ft 11 in (1.80 m)
- Position: Defender

Team information
- Current team: Oriente Petrolero

Youth career
- –2020: Valencia

Senior career*
Years	Team	Apps	(Gls)
2020–2022	Inter Miami	4	(0)
2020	→ Bolívar (loan)	33	(1)
2022	Inter Miami II	2	(1)
2022–2023	Zaragoza	1	(0)
2023–2025	Bolívar	25	(2)
2025-	Oriente Petrolero	7	(0)

International career^{‡}
2019	Bolivia U20	4	(0)
2020	Bolivia U23	4	(0)
2021–	Bolivia	22	(0)
- * Club domestic league appearances and goals as of 30 December 2025 ‡ National team caps and goals as of 20:12, 25 March 2024 (UTC)

Jairo Quinteros Sierra (born 7 February 2001) is a Bolivian professional footballer who plays as a defender for Oriente Petrolero and the Bolivia national team.

== Club career ==
Born in Santa Cruz, Bolivia, Quinteros began his career at the youth academy of La Liga side Valencia. After spending a few years in Spain, on February 12, 2020, Quinteros signed with Inter Miami in Major League Soccer. After signing with the club he was immediately loaned out to Club Bolívar in his native Bolivia's Primera División.

Quinteros made his professional debut for Club Bolívar on February 27 against Real Santa Cruz. He started and played the entire match as Bolívar won 4–2.

On 16 August 2022, Quinteros and Miami mutually agreed to terminate his contract with the club. On 1 September, he returned to Spain after signing a two-year deal with Segunda División side Real Zaragoza.

On 3 July 2023, Quinteros returned to Bolívar on a permanent deal.

== International career ==
Quinteros has represented Bolivia at the under-20 and under-23 levels. On 2 January 2019, Quinteros was selected as part of the Bolivia U20 side for the 2019 U-20 Sudamericano. He played every match as Bolivia finished last in their group. He represented the senior Bolivia national team in a 3–1 2022 FIFA World Cup qualification win over Venezuela on 3 June 2021.

== Career statistics ==
=== Club ===
As of match played 12 August 2023

Appearances and goals by club, season and competition
Club	Season	League			Cup		Continental		Other		Total	
Club	Season	Division	Apps	Goals	Apps	Goals	Apps	Goals	Apps	Goals	Apps	Goals
Inter Miami	2020	Major League Soccer	0	0	0	0	0	0	0	0	0	0
Inter Miami	2022	Major League Soccer	4	0	2	0	0	0	0	0	6	0
Inter Miami	Total		4	0	2	0	0	0	0	0	6	0
Club Bolívar (loan)	2020	Bolivian Primera División	11	1	0	0	2 (Note: Appearances in Copa Libertadores)	0	—		13	1
Club Bolívar (loan)	2021	Bolivian Primera División	26	0	0	0	9 (Note: Four appearances in Copa Libertadores, five appearances and one goal in Copa Sudamericana)	1	—		35	1
Club Bolívar (loan)	Total		37	1	0	0	11	1	0	0	48	2
Inter Miami II	2022	MLS Next Pro	2	0	—		—		—		2	0
Real Zaragoza	2022–23	Segunda División	1	0	0	0	—		—		1	0
Club Bolívar	2023	Bolivian Primera División	5	0	2	0	1	0	—		8	0
Career total			49	1	4	0	12	1	0	0	65	2

=== International ===
As of match played 21 June 2023

Appearances and goals by national team and year
National team	Year	Apps	Goals
Bolivia	2021	11	0
Bolivia	2022	4	0
Bolivia	2023	3	0
Total		18	0
