= 2025 Leagues Cup =

Soccer tournament held in Canada and the United States

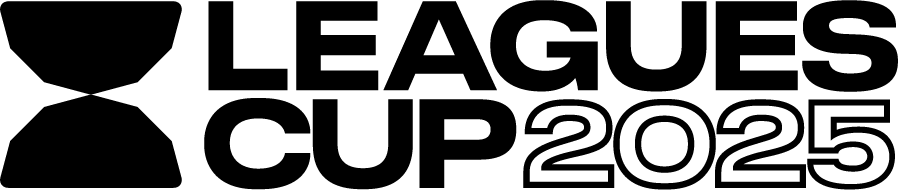

Tournament details
- Host countries: Canada; United States
- Dates: July 29 – August 31
- Teams: 36 (from 3 associations)

Final positions
- Champions: (United States) Seattle Sounders FC (1st title)
- Runners-up: (United States) Inter Miami CF
- Third place: (United States) LA Galaxy
- Fourth place: (United States) Orlando City SC

Tournament statistics
- Matches played: 62
- Goals scored: 200 (3.23 per match)
- Attendance: 1,058,038 (17,065 per match)
- Top scorer(s): (Argentina) Ángel Correa (5 goals)
- Best player: (Argentina) Pedro de la Vega
- Best goalkeeper: (United States) Andrew Thomas

The 2025 Leagues Cup was the fifth edition of the Leagues Cup, an international club soccer tournament contested by Major League Soccer (MLS) and Liga MX clubs in North America. It was held from July 29 to August 31, 2025, and featured 36 teams. Unlike the previous editions, only the top 18 MLS teams from the 2024 season qualified for the tournament. All 18 Liga MX clubs participated.

Seattle Sounders FC won their first Leagues Cup title by defeating Inter Miami CF 3–0 in the final. The match, played at Lumen Field in Seattle, Washington, set a tournament record for attendance with 69,314 spectators.

== Format ==
The tournament consisted of a group stage, known as "Phase One", and a knockout phase. During phase one, teams played three games against teams in the other league (i.e., all games were MLS vs Liga MX). The top four teams from each league advanced to the knockout stage, which consisted of the quarterfinals, semifinals and a final. Like previous editions of the Leagues Cup, the top three clubs qualified for the CONCACAF Champions Cup.

In Phase One, teams earned three points for a win in regulation, two points for a win in a penalty shoot-out, or one point for a loss in a penalty shoot-out. In the event two or more teams ended the group stage tied on points, these tiebreakers in order were used for ranking:

1. Greater number of wins in regular time.
2. Greater goal difference.
3. Greater number of goals scored.
4. Fewer number of goals conceded.
5. Fewer points in the team’s Fair Play Table.
6. A draw organized by the Organizing Committee.

== Teams ==
Thirty-six teams participated in the Leagues Cup, including all 18 Liga MX teams and 18 out of 30 MLS teams. The 18 MLS teams qualified for Leagues Cup by reaching the 2024 MLS Cup playoffs, with one exception: San Diego FC replaced Vancouver Whitecaps FC, who did not participate because they were competing in two other cup competitions in 2025.

=== Draw ===
To determine matchups, all teams were placed into a combined ranking that used the 2024 Supporters' Shield table for MLS teams and the most recent 34 matches in the 2024 Clausura and Apertura seasons for Liga MX teams. These teams were then divided into an East region and a West region based on geographical and performance criteria. Within each region, teams were assigned to tiers based on the combined ranking, with the restriction that each tier included three teams from each league.

Eastern clubs
Rank	Tier	Team	League
2	Tier 1	Inter Miami CF	MLS
3	Tier 1	Toluca	Liga MX
4	Tier 1	Columbus Crew	MLS
8	Tier 1	Monterrey	Liga MX
11	Tier 1	FC Cincinnati	MLS
12	Tier 1	Pumas UNAM	Liga MX
14	Tier 2	Guadalajara	Liga MX
16	Tier 2	Orlando City SC	MLS
18	Tier 2	Charlotte FC	MLS
19	Tier 2	New York City FC	MLS
27	Tier 2	León	Liga MX
28	Tier 2	Necaxa	Liga MX
22	Tier 3	New York Red Bulls	MLS
25	Tier 3	CF Montréal	MLS
29	Tier 3	Atlanta United FC	MLS
30	Tier 3	Atlas	Liga MX
32	Tier 3	Juárez	Liga MX
35	Tier 3	Puebla	Liga MX

Western clubs
Rank	Tier	Team	League
1	Tier 1	Cruz Azul	Liga MX
5	Tier 1	Tigres UANL	Liga MX
6	Tier 1	Los Angeles FC	MLS
7	Tier 1	LA Galaxy	MLS
9	Tier 1	América	Liga MX
10	Tier 1	Real Salt Lake	MLS
13	Tier 2	Seattle Sounders FC	MLS
15	Tier 2	Houston Dynamo FC	MLS
17	Tier 2	Minnesota United FC	MLS
23	Tier 2	Atlético San Luis	Liga MX
24	Tier 2	Tijuana	Liga MX
26	Tier 2	Pachuca	Liga MX
20	Tier 3	Colorado Rapids	MLS
21	Tier 3	Portland Timbers	MLS
31	Tier 3	Querétaro	Liga MX
33	Tier 3	Mazatlán	Liga MX
34	Tier 3	Santos Laguna	Liga MX
36	Tier 3	San Diego FC	MLS

=== Sets ===
Finally, six "sets" were formed by drawing one team per league from each of the three tiers of a region. Teams played three matches against teams from their set who were not from their league.

Eastern 1
Tier	Team	League
1	Toluca	Liga MX
1	Columbus Crew	MLS
2	New York City FC	MLS
2	León	Liga MX
3	CF Montréal	MLS
3	Puebla	Liga MX

Eastern 2
Tier	Team	League
1	Inter Miami CF	MLS
1	Pumas UNAM	Liga MX
2	Orlando City SC	MLS
2	Necaxa	Liga MX
3	Atlanta United FC	MLS
3	Atlas	Liga MX

Eastern 3
Tier	Team	League
1	Monterrey	Liga MX
1	FC Cincinnati	MLS
2	Guadalajara	Liga MX
2	Charlotte FC	MLS
3	New York Red Bulls	MLS
3	Juárez	Liga MX

Western 1
Tier	Team	League
1	Tigres UANL	Liga MX
1	Los Angeles FC	MLS
2	Houston Dynamo FC	MLS
2	Pachuca	Liga MX
3	Mazatlán	Liga MX
3	San Diego FC	MLS

Western 2
Tier	Team	League
1	América	Liga MX
1	Real Salt Lake	MLS
2	Minnesota United FC	MLS
2	Atlético San Luis	Liga MX
3	Portland Timbers	MLS
3	Querétaro	Liga MX

Western 3
Tier	Team	League
1	Cruz Azul	Liga MX
1	LA Galaxy	MLS
2	Seattle Sounders FC	MLS
2	Tijuana	Liga MX
3	Colorado Rapids	MLS
3	Santos Laguna	Liga MX

== Round dates ==
The schedule of the competition was as follows.

Schedule for 2025 Leagues Cup
Phase	Round	Date
League stage	Matchday 1	July 29–31
League stage	Matchday 2	August 1–3
League stage	Matchday 3	August 5–7
Knockout stage	Quarterfinals	August 20
Knockout stage	Semifinals	August 27
Knockout stage	Third place playoff	August 31
Knockout stage	Final	August 31

== League phase ==
=== Table ===
Liga MX

Pos	Team	Pld	W	PW	PL	L	GF	GA	GD	Pts	Qualification
1	Toluca	3	2	1	0	0	6	4	+2	8	Advance to knockout stage
2	Pachuca	3	2	0	1	0	6	4	+2	7	Advance to knockout stage
3	Tigres UANL	3	2	0	0	1	7	4	+3	6	Advance to knockout stage
4	Puebla	3	2	0	0	1	6	4	+2	6	Advance to knockout stage
5	Juárez	3	1	1	1	0	7	4	+3	6	
6	Guadalajara	3	1	1	0	1	4	4	0	5	
7	Mazatlán	3	1	1	0	1	3	3	0	5	
8	Pumas UNAM	3	1	1	0	1	5	6	−1	5	
9	Atlético San Luis	3	1	1	0	1	4	6	−2	5	
10	América	3	0	2	1	0	6	6	0	5	
11	Necaxa	3	1	0	1	1	6	8	−2	4	
12	Cruz Azul	3	0	2	0	1	3	10	−7	4	
13	Tijuana	3	1	0	0	2	5	8	−3	3	
14	Monterrey	3	0	1	0	2	3	6	−3	2	
15	León	3	0	0	1	2	1	4	−3	1	
16	Querétaro	3	0	0	0	3	1	6	−5	0	
17	Atlas	3	0	0	0	3	3	9	−6	0	
18	Santos Laguna	3	0	0	0	3	2	8	−6	0	

Source: Leagues Cup

See above for tie-breaking criteria.

Major League Soccer

Pos	Team	Pld	W	PW	PL	L	GF	GA	GD	Pts	Qualification
1	Seattle Sounders FC	3	3	0	0	0	11	2	+9	9	Advance to knockout stage
2	Inter Miami CF	3	2	1	0	0	7	4	+3	8	Advance to knockout stage
3	LA Galaxy	3	2	0	1	0	10	3	+7	7	Advance to knockout stage
4	Orlando City SC	3	2	0	1	0	9	3	+6	7	Advance to knockout stage
5	Portland Timbers	3	2	0	1	0	6	1	+5	7	
6	Columbus Crew	3	2	0	1	0	6	3	+3	7	
7	Real Salt Lake	3	1	1	1	0	5	4	+1	6	
8	Los Angeles FC	3	1	1	1	0	4	3	+1	6	
9	New York Red Bulls	3	1	1	1	0	3	2	+1	6	
10	Minnesota United FC	3	1	0	1	1	7	6	+1	4	
11	FC Cincinnati	3	1	0	1	1	6	6	0	4	
12	Colorado Rapids	3	1	0	1	1	5	5	0	4	
13	Charlotte FC	3	1	0	1	1	5	6	−1	4	
14	Atlanta United FC	3	1	0	0	2	7	7	0	3	
15	San Diego FC	3	1	0	0	2	5	5	0	3	
16	New York City FC	3	1	0	0	2	3	5	−2	3	
17	CF Montréal	3	0	1	0	2	3	5	−2	2	
18	Houston Dynamo FC	3	0	0	0	3	2	8	−6	0	

Source: Leagues Cup

See above for tie-breaking criteria.

=== Results ===
Matchday 1
Team 1	Score	Team 2
Toluca (Mexico)	2–2 (4–2 p)	(United States) Columbus Crew
Tigres UANL (Mexico)	4–1	(United States) Houston Dynamo FC
Los Angeles FC (United States)	1–1 (10–11 p)	(Mexico) Mazatlán
CF Montréal (Canada)	1–1 (7–6 p)	(Mexico) León
New York City FC (United States)	0–3	(Mexico) Puebla
Pachuca (Mexico)	3–2	(United States) San Diego FC
Necaxa (Mexico)	3–1	(United States) Atlanta United FC
Inter Miami CF (United States)	2–1	(Mexico) Atlas
Minnesota United FC (United States)	4–1	(Mexico) Querétaro
Pumas UNAM (Mexico)	1–1 (4–3 p)	(United States) Orlando City SC
Portland Timbers (United States)	4–0	(Mexico) Atlético San Luis
América (Mexico)	2–2 (1–3 p)	(United States) Real Salt Lake
Monterrey (Mexico)	2–3	(United States) FC Cincinnati
Charlotte FC (United States)	1–4	(Mexico) Juárez
Colorado Rapids (United States)	2–1	(Mexico) Santos Laguna
LA Galaxy (United States)	5–2	(Mexico) Tijuana
Guadalajara (Mexico)	0–1	(United States) New York Red Bulls
Cruz Azul (Mexico)	0–7	(United States) Seattle Sounders FC

Matchday 2
Team 1	Score	Team 2
Columbus Crew (United States)	3–1	(Mexico) Puebla
Houston Dynamo FC (United States)	0–2	(Mexico) Mazatlán
Los Angeles FC (United States)	1–1 (4–2 p)	(Mexico) Pachuca
Toluca (Mexico)	2–1	(Canada) CF Montréal
New York City FC (United States)	2–0	(Mexico) León
Tigres UANL (Mexico)	2–1	(United States) San Diego FC
Pumas UNAM (Mexico)	3–2	(United States) Atlanta United FC
Inter Miami CF (United States)	2–2 (5–4 p)	(Mexico) Necaxa
América (Mexico)	3–3 (8–7 p)	(United States) Minnesota United FC
Orlando City SC (United States)	3–1	(Mexico) Atlas
Portland Timbers (United States)	1–0	(Mexico) Querétaro
Real Salt Lake (United States)	2–2 (1–4 p)	(Mexico) Atlético San Luis
FC Cincinnati (United States)	2–2 (3–4 p)	(Mexico) Juárez
Guadalajara (Mexico)	2–2 (4–2 p)	(United States) Charlotte FC
Colorado Rapids (United States)	1–2	(Mexico) Tijuana
LA Galaxy (United States)	1–1 (7–8 p)	(Mexico) Cruz Azul
Monterrey (Mexico)	1–1 (5–3 p)	(United States) New York Red Bulls
Seattle Sounders FC (United States)	2–1	(Mexico) Santos Laguna

Matchday 3
Team 1	Score	Team 2
Columbus Crew (United States)	1–0	(Mexico) León
Houston Dynamo FC (United States)	1–2	(Mexico) Pachuca
Tigres UANL (Mexico)	1–2	(United States) Los Angeles FC
CF Montréal (Canada)	1–2	(Mexico) Puebla
Toluca (Mexico)	2–1	(United States) New York City FC
Mazatlán (Mexico)	0–2	(United States) San Diego FC
Atlanta United FC (United States)	4–1	(Mexico) Atlas
Inter Miami CF (United States)	3–1	(Mexico) Pumas UNAM
Minnesota United FC (United States)	0–2	(Mexico) Atlético San Luis
Orlando City SC (United States)	5–1	(Mexico) Necaxa
América (Mexico)	1–1 (5–3 p)	(United States) Portland Timbers
Real Salt Lake (United States)	1–0	(Mexico) Querétaro
Seattle Sounders FC (United States)	2–1	(Mexico) Tijuana
FC Cincinnati (United States)	1–2	(Mexico) Guadalajara
Monterrey (Mexico)	0–2	(United States) Charlotte FC
Cruz Azul (Mexico)	2–2 (5–4 p)	(United States) Colorado Rapids
LA Galaxy (United States)	4–0	(Mexico) Santos Laguna
New York Red Bulls (United States)	1–1 (5–3 p)	(Mexico) Juárez

== Knockout stage ==
The quarterfinal pairings were determined as follows:

- MLS 1 vs Liga MX 4
- MLS 2 vs Liga MX 3
- MLS 3 vs Liga MX 2
- MLS 4 vs Liga MX 1

=== Bracket ===
Quarterfinals
August 20 – Seattle
(United States) Seattle Sounders FC (p)	0 (4)
(Mexico) Puebla	0 (3)
August 20 – Carson
(United States) LA Galaxy	2
(Mexico) Pachuca	1
August 20 – Carson
(Mexico) Toluca	0 (5)
(United States) Orlando City SC (p)	0 (6)
August 20 – Fort Lauderdale
(United States) Inter Miami CF	2
(Mexico) Tigres UANL	1

Semifinals
August 27 – Carson
(United States) Seattle Sounders FC	2
(United States) LA Galaxy	0
August 27 – Fort Lauderdale
(United States) Orlando City SC	1
(United States) Inter Miami CF	3

Final
August 31 – Seattle
(United States) Seattle Sounders FC	3
(United States) Inter Miami CF	0
Third place playoff
August 31 – Carson
(United States) LA Galaxy	2
(United States) Orlando City SC	1

=== Quarterfinals ===
Quarterfinals
Team 1	Score	Team 2
Inter Miami CF (United States)	2–1	(Mexico) Tigres UANL
Toluca (Mexico)	0–0 (5–6 p)	(United States) Orlando City SC
Seattle Sounders FC (United States)	0–0 (4–3 p)	(Mexico) Puebla
LA Galaxy (United States)	2–1	(Mexico) Pachuca

=== Semifinals ===
Semifinals
Team 1	Score	Team 2
Inter Miami CF (United States)	3–1	(United States) Orlando City SC
LA Galaxy (United States)	0–2	(United States) Seattle Sounders FC

=== Third place playoff ===
The winners of the third place playoff qualified as the last seed to the 2026 CONCACAF Champions Cup.

Third place playoff
Team 1	Score	Team 2
LA Galaxy (United States)	2–1	(United States) Orlando City SC

=== Final ===
Both clubs that made the final qualified for the 2026 CONCACAF Champions Cup, with the winners qualifying directly to the round of 16.

August 31, 2025
5:00 p.m. PDT

Seattle Sounders FC (United States)	3–0	(United States) Inter Miami CF
De Rosario 26'; A. Roldán 84' (pen.); Rothrock 89'	Report

Lumen Field, Seattle, Washington
Attendance: 69,314
Referee: Juan Gabriel Calderón (Costa Rica)

== Statistics ==
=== Top goalscorers ===
Team eliminated for / did not play this round.

Rank	Player	Team	MD1	MD2	MD3	QF	SF	3rd	F	Total
1	(Argentina) Ángel Correa	(Mexico) Tigres UANL	2	2		1				5
2	(Guyana) Osaze De Rosario	(United States) Seattle Sounders FC	1		1		1		1	4
2	(Argentina) Martín Ojeda	(United States) Orlando City SC		1	2			1		4
2	(Ghana) Joseph Paintsil	(United States) LA Galaxy	2		1			1		4
2	(Portugal) Paulinho	(Mexico) Toluca	2	1	1					4
6	(Argentina) Tomás Badaloni	(Mexico) Necaxa	2	1						3
6	(Panama) Adalberto Carrasquilla	(Mexico) Pumas UNAM	1	2						3
6	(Argentina) Pedro de la Vega	(United States) Seattle Sounders FC	2				1			3
6	(Venezuela) David Martínez	(United States) Los Angeles FC	1		2					3
6	(Colombia) Luis Muriel	(United States) Orlando City SC			3					3
6	(Brazil) Matheus Nascimento	(United States) LA Galaxy	1		2					3
6	(Brazil) Rafael Navarro	(United States) Colorado Rapids	2		1					3
6	(Paraguay) Braian Ojeda	(United States) Real Salt Lake		2	1					3
6	(Germany) Marco Reus	(United States) LA Galaxy	1			1		1		3
6	(Venezuela) Telasco Segovia	(United States) Inter Miami CF	1	1			1			3
6	(Uruguay) Luis Suárez	(United States) Inter Miami CF			1	2				3
