= 2023 U.S. Open Cup final =

Final match in U.S. soccer tournament

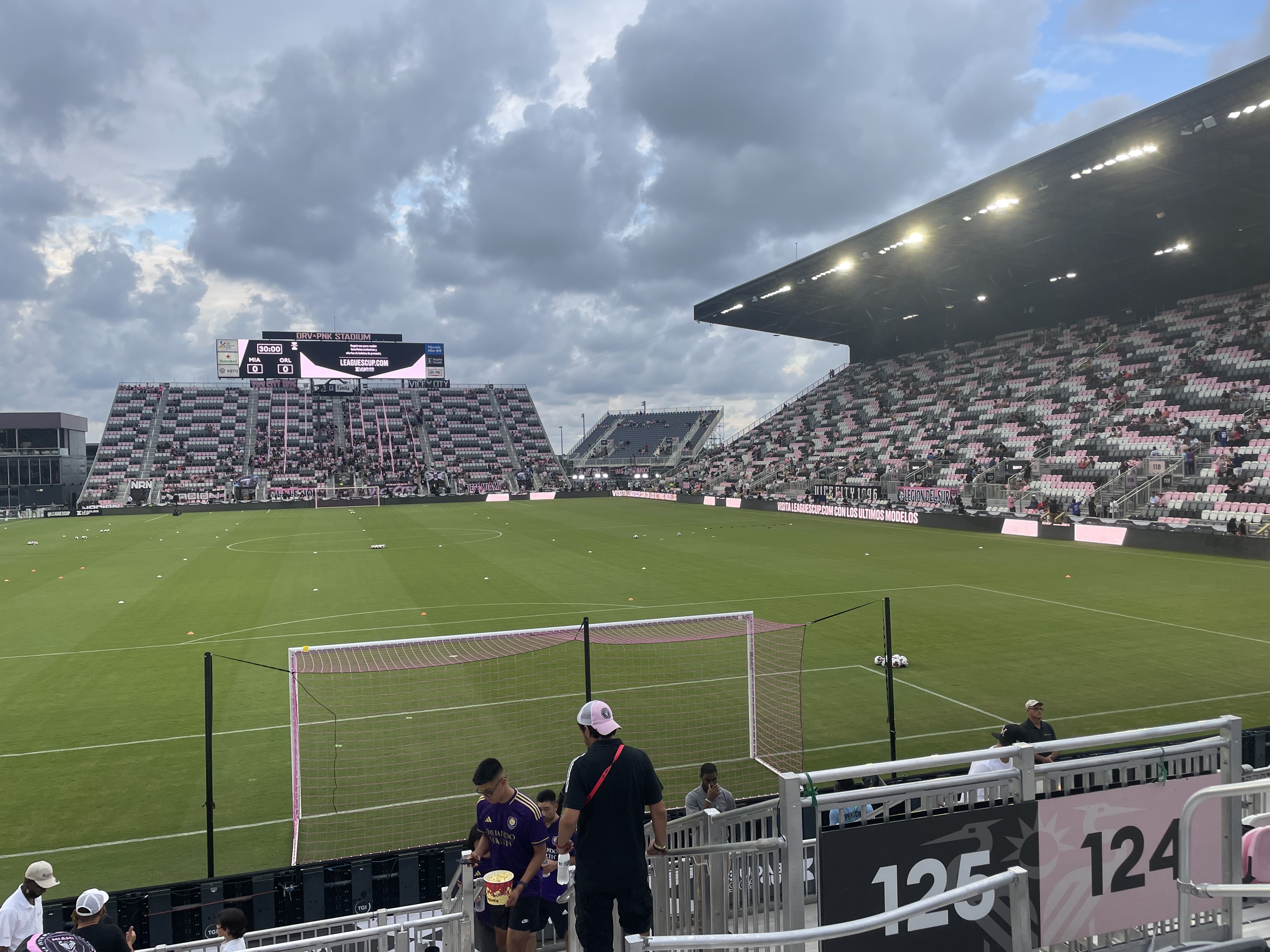
- DRV PNK Stadium, the host venue for the final
- Event: 2023 U.S. Open Cup
Inter Miami CF	Houston Dynamo FC
MLS	MLS
1	2
- Date: September 27, 2023
- Venue: DRV PNK Stadium, Fort Lauderdale, Florida
- Man of the Match: Griffin Dorsey (Houston Dynamo)
- Referee: Jon Freemon
- Attendance: 20,288

The 2023 Lamar Hunt U.S. Open Cup final was a soccer match played on September 27, 2023, at DRV PNK Stadium in Fort Lauderdale, Florida, United States. It was contested by Inter Miami CF and Houston Dynamo FC to determine the winner of the 108th edition of the Lamar Hunt U.S. Open Cup. The tournament is the oldest cup competition in U.S. soccer, which is open to amateur and professional soccer teams affiliated with the United States Soccer Federation.

The Houston Dynamo won their second U.S. Open Cup title by defeating hosts Miami 2–1.

== Road to the final ==
The Lamar Hunt U.S. Open Cup is an annual soccer competition open to adult teams in the United States that are affiliated with the United States Soccer Federation. Its 99 participants include professional and amateur teams, with the exception of reserve and academy teams that are directly owned and operated by Major League Soccer (MLS) clubs. The 2023 tournament was the 108th edition of the U.S. Open Cup, the oldest ongoing soccer tournament in the United States.

The 26 eligible MLS teams entered in the third and fourth rounds, facing teams from USL Championship (USLC), USL League One (USL1), the National Independent Soccer Association (NISA), and amateur leagues. From the third round onward, participants were organized into groups of four to six teams based on geographic location and pairings were drawn accordingly. Hosts were also determined with a random draw with priority given to venues that met minimum tournament standards. The two finalists, Inter Miami CF and Houston Dynamo FC, are both from MLS and had previously met in regular season play in April; Houston won the match 1–0 at home.

=== Inter Miami CF ===
Round	Opponent	Score
3rd	Miami FC (A)	2–2 (a.e.t.); 5–3 (p)
R32	Charleston Battery (H)	1–0
R16	Nashville SC (H)	2–1
QF	Birmingham Legion FC (A)	1–0
SF	FC Cincinnati (A)	3–3 (a.e.t.); 5–4 (p)
Key: (H) = Home; (A) = Away

Inter Miami CF joined MLS as an expansion team in 2020 and played in their first U.S. Open Cup in 2022, where they were eliminated in the round of 16 by in-state rivals Orlando City SC, who won a penalty shootout. They entered the third round of the 2023 U.S. Open Cup along with the lower tranche of MLS teams and were drawn against Miami FC, a USLC team from the same area. The match was played at Miami FC's home venue, FIU Stadium, and ended in a penalty shootout after a 2–2 draw; Inter Miami CF won the shootout 5–3 amid a six-match losing streak in league play.

The team advanced to the round of 32 and hosted the Charleston Battery of USLC, who they defeated 1–0 through an own goal. Inter Miami CF then traveled to play Nashville SC, who they lost to six days before their round of 16 fixture; Miami won 2–1 and ended Nashville's eight-match unbeaten streak after the match was disrupted for a half-hour due to a lightning delay. Striker Nicolás Stefanelli entered the match as a second-half substitute and scored the winning goal in the 73rd minute, restoring a lead that the team had gained in the 57th minute through Franco Negri.

Stefanelli then scored the lone goal in Inter Miami CF's 1–0 quarterfinal victory in June against Birmingham Legion FC, a USLC team that hosted the fixture and set a soccer attendance record for Alabama. Miami made major changes to their squad in the two months between rounds by hiring manager Gerardo "Tata" Martino and signing international stars Lionel Messi, Jordi Alba, and Sergio Busquets—all former FC Barcelona players. Four days after their victory in the Leagues Cup final, Inter Miami CF traveled to play FC Cincinnati in the U.S. Open Cup semifinals. Cincinnati took a 2–0 lead early in the second half, but Messi's two assists to Leonardo Campana were converted—the latter in stoppage time—to force extra time. Josef Martínez's strike gave Miami a 3–2 lead until Yuya Kubo equalized for Cincinnati as the match ended in a 3–3 draw. In the fifth round of the penalty shootout, Nick Hagglund's shot was saved by Drake Callender and rookie Benjamin Cremaschi converted his to give Inter Miami CF a berth in the U.S. Open Cup final.

=== Houston Dynamo FC ===
Round	Opponent	Score
3rd	Tampa Bay Rowdies (A)	1–0
R32	Sporting Kansas City (H)	1–0
R16	Minnesota United FC (H)	4–0
QF	Chicago Fire FC (A)	4–1
SF	Real Salt Lake (H)	3–1 (a.e.t.)
Key: (H) = Home; (A) = Away

The Dynamo won the 2018 edition of the U.S. Open Cup against the Philadelphia Union and had yet to return to a final; the team had also been completely rebuilt under new head coach Ben Olsen. Houston entered the 2023 edition in the third round and faced USLC's Tampa Bay Rowdies on the road in Florida. The Dynamo won 1–0 through a goal from teenage striker Brooklyn Raines before half-time and several saves by goalkeeper Andrew Tarbell to preserve a shutout.

Houston advanced to the round of 32 and hosted Sporting Kansas City, who they defeated 1–0 with a volleyed goal from outside the penalty area by Thorleifur Úlfarsson in the 11th minute; Chase Gasper was sent off with a red card in the 35th minute, but the team held on for a shutout. The Dynamo hosted their round of 16 match against Minnesota United FC and continued their shutout streak in Open Cup play with a 4–0 victory. Corey Baird earned a hat-trick, including a penalty kick in the first half, and was joined by substitute Ibrahim Aliyu's goal in the second half for Houston.

The Dynamo won 4–1 on the road to Chicago Fire FC in the quarterfinals with a penalty converted by Amine Bassi, two goals by Ibrahim Aliyu, and a finish by Nelson Quiñónes on a cross by Héctor Herrera in the 74th minute. The team returned home to Houston's Shell Energy Stadium for the semifinal match against Real Salt Lake. Herrera scored in the first half's stoppage time to give the Dynamo a lead that was erased by Anderson Julio's header; the match remained tied at 1–1 at the end of regulation time. During extra time, Houston retook the lead through a shot by Adalberto Carrasquilla in the 105th minute, which was followed by a brawl between players after Brayan Vera was sent off. Luis Caicedo scored the final goal of the night for the Dynamo in the fifth minute of stoppage time to give the team a 3–1 win. With their appearance in the final, Houston also qualified for the 2024 CONCACAF Champions Cup, as Inter Miami CF had already qualified through their Leagues Cup title.

== Venue ==
The final was played at DRV PNK Stadium in Fort Lauderdale, Florida, the 21,000-seat home venue of Inter Miami CF. The team's owner, Jorge Mas, stated in an interview that hosting the match at the larger Hard Rock Stadium was a possibility. A draw conducted by the United States Soccer Federation on June 8 determined hosting priority for the semifinals and final, with priority for Real Salt Lake, followed by Inter Miami CF, and FC Cincinnati. Tickets for the match were listed on secondary markets for $150 to $4,000 on the day of the match.

== Broadcasting ==
In the United States, the final was broadcast on the CBS Sports Network and streaming service Paramount+ in English. The match was also be broadcast in Spanish on Telemundo and Universo as well as streaming platform Peacock; the Spanish broadcast included a 30-minute pregame show. The match's radio broadcast was available in Spanish on the Fútbol de Primera network. A total of 52 international broadcasters covered the match, primarily from Latin America.

== Match ==
=== Team selection ===
For Inter Miami CF, star midfielder Lionel Messi and left back Jordi Alba were both injured and unavailable for the match.

=== Summary ===
Houston had the majority of possession in the first half and created several attacking chances that forced early saves out of Drake Callender. The away side took the lead in the 24th minute through a strike by Griffin Dorsey, which was followed by a penalty call in their favor in the 33rd minute for a foul by DeAndre Yedlin. Amine Bassi converted the penalty for the Dynamo in the 33rd minute to give the team a 2–0 lead at half-time. Miami made several adjustments at half-time, including the addition of Josef Martínez, but failed to convert most of their chances. Houston scored an apparent third goal in the 73rd minute that was overturned by the video assistant referee for an offside. Martínez scored a consolation goal in stoppage time as the Dynamo won 2–1 to clinch their second U.S. Open Cup title.

=== Details ===
September 27, 2023
8:30 p.m. EDT

Inter Miami CF	1–2	Houston Dynamo FC
Martínez 90+2'	MLS; USSF	Dorsey 24'; Bassi 33' (pen.)

DRV PNK Stadium, Fort Lauderdale, Florida
Attendance: 20,288
Referee: Jon Freemon

Inter Miami CF	Houston Dynamo FC

GK	1	(United States) Drake Callender
DF	2	(United States) DeAndre Yedlin (c)	(yellow card) 32'	(substituted off) 76'
DF	27	(Ukraine) Serhiy Kryvtsov	(yellow card) 16'
DF	31	(Canada) Kamal Miller
DF	32	(United States) Noah Allen	(yellow card) 19'
MF	30	(United States) Benjamin Cremaschi		(substituted off) 84'
MF	5	(Spain) Sergio Busquets
MF	8	(Paraguay) Diego Gómez		(substituted off) 46'
FW	11	(Argentina) Facundo Farías
FW	9	(Ecuador) Leonardo Campana
FW	16	(Finland) Robert Taylor		(substituted off) 46'
Substitutes:
GK	29	(United States) CJ dos Santos
DF	4	(Sweden) Christopher McVey
DF	6	(Argentina) Tomás Avilés
MF	3	(Ecuador) Dixon Arroyo		(substituted on) 46'
MF	41	(Honduras) David Ruiz		(substituted on) 76'
FW	17	(Venezuela) Josef Martínez		(substituted on) 46'
FW	22	(Argentina) Nicolás Stefanelli		(substituted on) 84'
Manager:
(Argentina) Gerardo Martino

GK	13	(United States) Andrew Tarbell
DF	2	(Argentina) Franco Escobar	(yellow card) 12'
DF	28	(Denmark) Erik Sviatchenko
DF	31	(Brazil) Micael
DF	25	(United States) Griffin Dorsey
MF	20	(Panama) Adalberto Carrasquilla		(substituted off) 90+1'
MF	16	(Mexico) Héctor Herrera (c)
MF	6	(Brazil) Artur
FW	8	(Morocco) Amine Bassi		(substituted off) 84'
FW	11	(United States) Corey Baird		(substituted off) 84'
FW	21	(Colombia) Nelson Quiñónes		(substituted off) 79'
Substitutes:
GK	12	(United States) Steve Clark
DF	3	(Australia) Brad Smith		(substituted on) 79'
DF	5	(United States) Daniel Steres
DF	17	(Zimbabwe) Teenage Hadebe		(substituted on) 90+1'
MF	7	(Paraguay) Iván Franco
MF	27	(Colombia) Luis Caicedo		(substituted on) 84'
FW	18	(Nigeria) Ibrahim Aliyu		(substituted on) 84'
Manager:
(United States) Ben Olsen
