= 2023 Inter Miami CF season =

Inter Miami CF
2023 season
- President: David Beckham
- Head coach: Phil Neville (until June 1); Javier Morales (interim, from June 1 to July 10); Gerardo Martino (from July 10)
- Stadium: DRV PNK Stadium
- Major League Soccer: Conference: 14th Overall: 27th
- MLS Cup playoffs: Did not qualify
- U.S. Open Cup: Runners-up
- Leagues Cup: Winners
- Top goalscorer: League: Leonardo Campana (9); All: Josef Martínez (12)
- Average home league attendance: 17,698
Home colors	Away colors

The 2023 Inter Miami CF season was the fourth season in the history of Inter Miami CF and the 20th season of first-division club soccer in South Florida. In addition to playing in Major League Soccer, the club participated in the U.S. Open Cup and the new-look Leagues Cup for the first time.

The 2023 season was marked by the high profile summer arrival of then FIFA World Cup winner Lionel Messi, as well as his former FC Barcelona teammates Jordi Alba and Sergio Busquets. The three new additions helped guide Inter Miami to the Leagues Cup title, the club's first ever trophy, after defeating Nashville SC on penalties in the final. Miami also reached the U.S. Open Cup final for the first time, but lost 2–1 at home to Houston Dynamo FC.

Despite this resurgence in the late stage of the season that followed Inter Miami's new player arrivals and the appointment of head coach Gerardo Martino, it ultimately could not make up for a poor start to the campaign under previous manager Phil Neville, including two separate losing streaks of six and seven games, respectively, a 11-game winless streak spanning two months, and the club thus failed to qualify for the MLS Cup Playoffs, finishing second from bottom in the final Eastern Conference standings.

== Management ==
Position	Staff
Ownership
Lead Managing Owner	(United States) Jorge Mas
President and Co-Owner	(England) David Beckham
Co-Owner	(United States) Jose Mas
Front Office
Chief Business Officer	(Spain) Xavier Asensi
Sporting Director	(United States) Chris Henderson
Vice President	(United States) Pablo Alvarez
Coaching Staff
Head Coach	(Argentina) Gerardo Martino
Assistant Coach	(Argentina) Javier Morales
Goalkeeper Coach	(Argentina) Sebastián Saja
Performance Director	(United States) Garrison Draper
Assistant Coach & Performance Analyst	(England) Alec Scott
Performance Analyst	(United States) Connor Ceballos

Last updated: July 20, 2023

== Roster ==
As of October 22, 2023

No.	Player	Nationality	Position	Date of birth (age)	Signed from
Goalkeepers
1	Drake Callender	(United States)	GK	October 7, 1997 (aged 26)	(United States) San Jose Earthquakes
29	CJ dos Santos	(United States)	GK	August 24, 2000 (aged 23)	(Portugal) Benfica
99	Cole Jensen	(United States)	GK	January 22, 2001 (aged 22)	(United States) Xavier University
Defenders
2	DeAndre Yedlin	(United States)	DF	July 9, 1993 (aged 30)	(Turkey) Galatasaray
4	Christopher McVey	(Sweden)	DF	April 12, 1997 (aged 26)	(Sweden) IF Elfsborg
6	Tomás Avilés	(Argentina)	DF	August 3, 2004 (aged 19)	(Argentina) Racing Club
15	Ryan Sailor	(United States)	DF	November 27, 1998 (aged 24)	(United States) University of Washington
18	Jordi Alba	(Spain)	DF	March 21, 1989 (aged 34)	(Spain) Barcelona
24	Ian Fray	(United States)	DF	August 31, 2002 (aged 21)	(United States) Fort Lauderdale CF
27	Serhiy Kryvtsov	(Ukraine)	DF	March 15, 1991 (aged 32)	(Ukraine) Shakhtar Donetsk
31	Kamal Miller	(Canada)	DF	May 16, 1997 (aged 26)	(Canada) CF Montréal
32	Noah Allen	(United States)	DF	April 28, 2004 (aged 19)	(United States) Inter Miami CF II
33	Franco Negri	(Argentina)	DF	February 20, 1995 (aged 28)	(Argentina) Godoy Cruz
Midfielders
3	Dixon Arroyo	(Ecuador)	MF	June 1, 1992 (aged 31)	(Ecuador) Emelec
5	Sergio Busquets	(Spain)	MF	July 16, 1988 (aged 35)	(Spain) Barcelona
7	Jean Mota	(Brazil)	MF	October 15, 1993 (aged 30)	(Brazil) Santos
8	Diego Gómez	(Paraguay)	MF	March 27, 2003 (aged 20)	(Paraguay) Libertad
11	Facundo Farías	(Argentina)	MF	August 28, 2002 (aged 21)	(Argentina) Colón
13	Víctor Ulloa	(Mexico)	MF	March 4, 1992 (aged 31)	(United States) FC Cincinnati
16	Robert Taylor	(Finland)	MF	October 21, 1994 (aged 29)	(Norway) Brann
26	Gregore	(Brazil)	MF	March 2, 1994 (aged 29)	(Brazil) Bahia
28	Edison Azcona	(Dominican Republic)	MF	November 21, 2003 (aged 19)	(United States) Fort Lauderdale CF
30	Benjamin Cremaschi	(United States)	MF	March 2, 2005 (aged 18)	(United States) Inter Miami CF II
35	Felipe Valencia	(United States)	MF	March 1, 2005 (aged 18)	(United States) Fort Lauderdale CF
41	David Ruiz	(Honduras)	MF	February 8, 2004 (aged 19)	(United States) Inter Miami CF II
43	Lawson Sunderland	(United States)	MF	November 7, 2001 (aged 21)	(United States) Inter Miami CF II
81	Santiago Morales	(United States)	MF	February 9, 2007 (aged 16)	(United States) Inter Miami CF II
Forwards
9	Leonardo Campana	(Ecuador)	FW	July 24, 2000 (aged 23)	(England) Wolverhampton Wanderers
10	Lionel Messi (captain)	(Argentina)	FW	June 24, 1987 (aged 36)	(France) Paris Saint-Germain
14	Corentin Jean	(France)	FW	July 15, 1995 (aged 28)	(France) Lens
17	Josef Martínez	(Venezuela)	FW	May 19, 1993 (aged 30)	(United States) Atlanta United FC
19	Robbie Robinson	(United States)	FW	December 17, 1998 (aged 24)	(United States) Clemson University
22	Nicolás Stefanelli	(Argentina)	FW	November 22, 1994 (aged 28)	(Sweden) AIK

== Transfers ==
=== Transfers in ===
Date	Position	No.	Player	From	Fee	Ref.
Winter 2022–23
November 12, 2022	FW	12	(United States) Jake LaCava	(United States) St. Louis City SC	$150,000 GAM	
November 28, 2022	MF	30	(United States) Benjamin Cremaschi	(United States) Inter Miami CF II	Homegrown Player	
January 1, 2023	MF	28	(Dominican Republic) Edison Azcona	(United States) El Paso Locomotive	End of loan	
January 1, 2023	MF	20	(Mexico) Rodolfo Pizarro	(Mexico) Monterrey	End of loan	
January 5, 2023	FW	22	(Argentina) Nicolás Stefanelli	(Sweden) AIK	Undisclosed	
January 11, 2023	DF	33	(Argentina) Franco Negri	(Argentina) Godoy Cruz	Undisclosed	
January 18, 2023	FW	17	(Venezuela) Josef Martínez	(United States) Atlanta United FC	Undisclosed	
January 20, 2023	FW	9	(Ecuador) Leonardo Campana	(England) Wolverhampton Wanderers	Undisclosed	
January 31, 2023	DF	27	(Ukraine) Serhiy Kryvtsov	(Ukraine) Shakhtar Donetsk	Undisclosed	
February 16, 2023	FW	49	(Haiti) Shanyder Borgelin	(United States) Inter Miami CF II	Homegrown Player	
February 23, 2023	GK	99	(United States) Cole Jensen	(United States) Xavier University	SuperDraft	
April 12, 2023	DF	31	(Canada) Kamal Miller	(Canada) CF Montréal	Trade	
April 13, 2023	MF	3	(Ecuador) Dixon Arroyo	(Ecuador) Emelec	Free	
April 28, 2023	MF	41	(Honduras) David Ruiz	(United States) Inter Miami CF II	Homegrown Player	
Summer 2023
July 15, 2023	FW	10	(Argentina) Lionel Messi	(France) Paris Saint-Germain	Free	
July 16, 2023	MF	5	(Spain) Sergio Busquets	(Spain) Barcelona	Free	
July 19, 2023	MF	8	(Paraguay) Diego Gómez	(Paraguay) Libertad	Undisclosed	
July 20, 2023	DF	18	(Spain) Jordi Alba	(Spain) Barcelona	Free	
July 29, 2023	MF	11	(Argentina) Facundo Farías	(Argentina) Colón	Undisclosed	
August 1, 2023	DF	6	(Argentina) Tomás Avilés	(Argentina) Racing Club	Undisclosed	
September 8, 2023	MF	43	(United States) Lawson Sunderland	(United States) Inter Miami CF II	Homegrown Player	
September 12, 2023	MF	81	(United States) Santiago Morales	(United States) Inter Miami CF II	Homegrown Player	

=== Transfers out ===
Date	Position	No.	Player	To	Fee	Ref.
Winter 2022–23
November 7, 2022	MF	30	(United States) George Acosta	(Colombia) Cortuluá	Option declined	
November 7, 2022	DF	20	(United States) Brek Shea	Retired	Option declined	
November 7, 2022	DF	33	(Trinidad and Tobago) Joevin Jones	(Trinidad and Tobago) Police	Free	
November 7, 2022	MF	8	(Spain) Alejandro Pozuelo	(Turkey) Konyaspor	Free	
November 7, 2022	FW	10	(Argentina) Gonzalo Higuaín	Retired	Option declined	
November 11, 2022	FW	17	(United States) Indiana Vassilev	(United States) St. Louis City SC	Expansion Draft	
January 25, 2023	DF	31	(Jamaica) Damion Lowe	(United States) Philadelphia Union	$225,000 GAM	
January 27, 2023	MF	25	(Colombia) Emerson Rodríguez	(Mexico) Santos Laguna	Loan	
February 23, 2023	DF	3	(England) Kieran Gibbs	Retired	Mutual agreement	
April 12, 2023	MF	8	(United States) Bryce Duke	(Canada) CF Montréal	Trade	
April 12, 2023	FW	11	(Costa Rica) Ariel Lassiter	(Canada) CF Montréal	Trade	
April 25, 2023	DF	6	(Zambia) Aimé Mabika	(Canada) Toronto FC	$100,000 GAM	
Summer 2023
June 9, 2023	FW	12	(United States) Jake LaCava	(United States) Tampa Bay Rowdies	Loan	
July 14, 2023	MF	20	(Mexico) Rodolfo Pizarro	(Greece) AEK Athens	Mutual Agreement	
August 4, 2023	GK	21	(Netherlands) Nick Marsman	MLS Pool	Buyout	
August 16, 2023	FW	49	(Haiti) Shanyder Borgelin	(United States) New Mexico United	Loan	
August 24, 2023	DF	20	(Republic of Ireland) Harvey Neville	(United States) Loudoun United FC	Loan	

=== MLS SuperDraft ===
Round	No.	Player	Pos.	Team
1	18	(United States) Cole Jensen	GK	Xavier University
2	47	(United States) Bachir Ndiaye	MF	UNC Wilmington

== Non-competitive ==
=== Preseason ===
January 21 1	Inter Miami	0–3	Vasco da Gama	Fort Lauderdale, FL
7:00 p.m. EST		Report	Nenê; Teixeira; Figueiredo	Stadium: DRV PNK Stadium

January 25 2	Inter Miami	4–1	FIU Panthers	Fort Lauderdale, FL
	LaCava; Campana (o.g.)	Report	Goal	Stadium: Florida Blue Training Center
Note: The match was played behind closed doors.

January 28 3	Inter Miami	0–4	St. Louis City SC	Fort Lauderdale, FL
		Report	Vassilev 38'; Bartlett 64'; Adeniran 89'; Pompeu 105' (pen.)	Stadium: Florida Blue Training Center
Note: The match was played in three 40-minute periods.

February 2 4	Inter Miami	2–2	New England Revolution	Lakewood Ranch, FL
	Campana,	Report	,	Stadium: Premier Sports Complex
Note: The match was played behind closed doors.

February 15 5	Inter Miami	1–2	CF Montréal	Fort Lauderdale, FL
	Ulloa 56'		Quioto 3'; Saliba 31'	Stadium: Florida Blue Training Center
Note: The match was played behind closed doors.

February 18 6	Inter Miami	2–2	Austin FC	Fort Lauderdale, FL
	Jean 62'; Pizarro 68'	Report	Rigoni 53'; Wolff 86'	Stadium: DRV PNK Stadium

=== Friendlies ===
November 10 Noche d'Or	Inter Miami	1–2	New York City FC	Fort Lauderdale, FL
8:00p.m. EST	Robinson 81'	Report	Talles Magno 43'; Fernández 48'	Stadium: DRV PNK Stadium; Referee: Ismir Pekmic

== Competitive ==
=== Overview ===
Competition	Record							
Competition	Pld	W	L	T	GF	GA	GD	Win %
Major League Soccer	34	9	18	7	41	54	−13	26.47
U.S. Open Cup	6	3	1	2	10	8	+2	50.00
Leagues Cup	7	5	0	2	22	8	+14	71.43
Total	47	17	19	11	73	70	+3	36.17

=== Major League Soccer ===
==== Standings ====
===== Eastern Conference =====
MLS Eastern Conference table (2023)
Pos	Team	Pld	W	L	T	GF	GA	GD	Pts
11	New York City FC	34	9	11	14	35	39	−4	41
12	D.C. United	34	10	14	10	45	49	−4	40
13	Chicago Fire FC	34	10	14	10	39	51	−12	40
14	Inter Miami CF	34	9	18	7	41	54	−13	34
15	Toronto FC	34	4	20	10	26	59	−33	22

Source: MLS
Rules for classification: 1) points; 2) total wins; 3) total goal differential; 4) total goals scored; 5) fewer disciplinary points; 6) away goal differential; 7) away goals scored; 8) home goals differential; 9) home goals scored; 10) coin toss (2 clubs tied) or drawing of lots (≥3 clubs tied)

===== Overall table =====
Overall MLS standings table
Pos	Team	Pld	W	L	T	GF	GA	GD	Pts	Qualification
25	Austin FC	34	10	15	9	49	55	−6	39	
26	LA Galaxy	34	8	14	12	51	67	−16	36	
27	Inter Miami CF (L)	34	9	18	7	41	54	−13	34	Qualification for the CONCACAF Champions Cup round of 16 (Note: As 2023 Leagues Cup champions)
28	Colorado Rapids	34	5	17	12	26	54	−28	27	
29	Toronto FC	34	4	20	10	26	59	−33	22	

Source: MLS
Rules for classification: 1) points; 2) total wins; 3) total goal differential; 4) total goals scored; 5) fewer disciplinary points; 6) away goal differential; 7) away goals scored; 8) home goals differential; 9) home goals scored; 10) coin toss (2 clubs tied) or drawing of lots (≥3 clubs tied)
(L) Leagues Cup winner

==== Results summary ====
Overall								Home						Away					
Pld	Pts	W	L	T	GF	GA	GD	W	L	T	GF	GA	GD	W	L	T	GF	GA	GD
34	34	9	18	7	41	54	−13	6	6	5	25	21	+4	3	12	2	16	33	−17

Source: MLS
Pld = Matches played; Pts = Points; W = Matches won; T = Matches tied; L = Matches lost; GF = Goals for; GA = Goals against; GD = Goal difference

==== Results by round ====
Round	1	2	3	4	5	6	7	8	9	10	11	12	13	14	15	16	17	18	19	20	21	22	23	24	25	26	27	28	29	30	31	32	33	34
Ground	H	H	A	A	H	A	H	A	A	H	H	A	H	A	H	H	A	A	H	H	A	A	A	H	A	H	A	H	A	H	A	H	H	A
Result	W	W	L	L	L	L	L	L	W	W	W	L	L	L	L	L	L	L	D	D	D	L	W	D	W	W	L	W	D	D	L	L	D	L

Source: IMCF schedule
A = Away; H = Home; W = Win; D = Draw; L = Loss

==== Match results ====
February 25 1	Inter Miami	2–0	CF Montréal	Fort Lauderdale, FL
7:30 p.m. EST	Kryvtsov 41'; Borgelin 76'	Report		Stadium: DRV PNK Stadium; Attendance: 17,655; Referee: Drew Fischer

March 4 2	Inter Miami	2–0	Philadelphia Union	Fort Lauderdale, FL
7:30 p.m. EST	Jean 32'; Taylor 77'	Report		Stadium: DRV PNK Stadium; Attendance: 15,628; Referee: Chris Penso

March 11 3	New York City FC	1–0	Inter Miami	New York, NY
7:30 p.m. EST	McVey 36' (o.g.)	Report		Stadium: Yankee Stadium; Attendance: 24,489; Referee: Lukasz Szpala

March 18 4	Toronto FC	2–0	Inter Miami	Toronto, ON
7:30 p.m. EDT	Osorio 48'; Kaye 69'	Report		Stadium: BMO Field; Attendance: 20,701; Referee: Alex Chilowicz

March 25 5	Inter Miami	2–3	Chicago Fire FC	Fort Lauderdale, FL
7:30 p.m. EDT	Negri 45+3'; Stefanelli 76'	Report	Mueller 30'; Terán 38'; Kamara 90+2'	Stadium: DRV PNK Stadium; Attendance: 17,699; Referee: Tori Penso

April 1 6	FC Cincinnati	1–0	Inter Miami	Cincinnati, OH
7:30 p.m. EDT	Mosquera 45+5'	Report		Stadium: TQL Stadium; Attendance: 25,082; Referee: Nima Saghafi

April 8 7	Inter Miami	0–1	FC Dallas	Fort Lauderdale, FL
7:30 p.m. EDT		Report	Ferreira 27'	Stadium: DRV PNK Stadium; Attendance: 17,287; Referee: Filip Dujic

April 22 8	Houston Dynamo FC	1–0	Inter Miami	Houston, TX
8:30 p.m. EDT	Steres 72'	Report		Stadium: Shell Energy Stadium; Attendance: 16,045; Referee: Rosendo Mendoza

April 29 9	Columbus Crew	1–2	Inter Miami	Columbus, OH
7:30 p.m. EDT	Hernández 10'	Report	Campana 7', 41'	Stadium: Lower.com Field; Attendance: 20,410; Referee: Pierre-Luc Lauziere

May 6 10	Inter Miami	2–1	Atlanta United FC	Fort Lauderdale, FL
7:30 p.m. EST	Martínez 59' (pen.), 75'; Negri (red card) 84'	Report	Gutman 90+2'	Stadium: DRV PNK Stadium; Attendance: 16,750; Referee: Armando Villarreal

May 13 11	Inter Miami	2–1	New England Revolution	Fort Lauderdale, FL
7:30 p.m. EDT	Ruiz 6' (yellow card) 37' (yellow-red card) 81'; Martínez 44'	Report	Gil 26'	Stadium: DRV PNK Stadium; Attendance: 17,349; Referee: Ismir Pekmic

May 17 12	Nashville SC	2–1	Inter Miami	Nashville, TN
8:30 p.m. EDT	Picault 33'; MacNaughton 49'	Report	Arroyo 90+3'	Stadium: Geodis Park; Attendance: 25,839; Referee: Alex Chilowicz

May 20 13	Inter Miami	1–3	Orlando City SC	Fort Lauderdale, FL
7:30 p.m. EDT	Campana 57'	Report	Kara 19'; Ojeda 68'; Santos 86'	Stadium: DRV PNK Stadium; Attendance: 17,643; Referee: Ramy Touchan

May 27 14	CF Montréal	1–0	Inter Miami	Montréal, QC
7:30 p.m. EDT	Offor 53'	Report		Stadium: Saputo Stadium; Attendance: 19,619; Referee: Nima Saghafi

May 31 15	Inter Miami	0–1	New York Red Bulls	Fort Lauderdale, FL
7:30 p.m. EDT		Report	Barlow 52'; Harper (yellow card) 61' (yellow-red card) 90+4'	Stadium: DRV PNK Stadium; Attendance: 15,136; Referee: Pierre-Luc Lauziere

June 3 16	Inter Miami	1–2	D.C. United	Fort Lauderdale, FL
7:30 p.m. EDT	Miller (red card) 7'; Fray 90+2'	Report	Pines 76'; Benteke 90'	Stadium: DRV PNK Stadium; Attendance: 15,040; Referee: Marcos de Oliveira

June 10 17	New England Revolution	3–1	Inter Miami	Foxborough, MA
7:30 p.m. EDT	Gil 27' (pen.); Polster 34'; Wood 51'	Report	Martínez 84'	Stadium: Gillette Stadium; Attendance: 36,235; Referee: Sergii Boiko

June 24 18	Philadelphia Union	4–1	Inter Miami	Chester, PA
7:30 p.m. EDT	Glesnes 14'; Carranza 39'; Flach 45+4'; Ruiz 68' (o.g.)	Report	Taylor 50'	Stadium: Subaru Park; Attendance: 19,535; Referee: Malik Badawi

July 1 19	Inter Miami	1–1	Austin FC	Fort Lauderdale, FL
7:30 p.m. EDT	Martínez 47'	Report	Lima 51'	Stadium: DRV PNK Stadium; Attendance: 17,053; Referee: Filip Dujic

July 4 20	Inter Miami	2–2	Columbus Crew	Fort Lauderdale, FL
7:30 p.m. EDT	Campana 57'; Martínez 90'	Report	Nagbe 23'; Ramírez 69'	Stadium: DRV PNK Stadium; Attendance: 14,072; Referee: Alex Chilowicz

July 8 21	D.C. United	2–2	Inter Miami	Washington, D.C.
7:30 p.m. EDT	Fountas 65'; Robertha 77'	Report	Cremaschi 59'; Allen 68'	Stadium: Audi Field; Attendance: 19,215; Referee: Rosendo Mendoza

July 15 22	St. Louis City SC	3–0	Inter Miami	St. Louis, MO
8:30 p.m. EDT	Adeniran 28'; Parker 40'; Löwen 80'	Report		Stadium: Citypark; Attendance: 22,423; Referee: Lukasz Szpala

August 26 23	New York Red Bulls	0–2	Inter Miami	Harrison, NJ
7:30 p.m. EDT		Report	Gómez 37'; Messi 89'	Stadium: Red Bull Arena; Attendance: 26,276; Referee: Allen Chapman

August 30 24	Inter Miami	0–0	Nashville SC	Fort Lauderdale, FL
7:30 p.m. EDT		Report		Stadium: DRV PNK Stadium; Attendance: 20,452; Referee: Chris Penso

September 3 25	Los Angeles FC	1–3	Inter Miami	Los Angeles, CA
10:00 p.m. EDT	Hollingshead 90'	Report	Farías 14'; Alba 51'; Campana 83'	Stadium: BMO Stadium; Attendance: 22,921; Referee: Ted Unkel
Note: The match was originally scheduled for September 2.

September 9 26	Inter Miami	3–2	Sporting Kansas City	Fort Lauderdale, FL
7:30 p.m. EDT	Campana 25' (pen.), 45'; Farías 60'	Report	Sallói 9'; Pulido 78'	Stadium: DRV PNK Stadium; Attendance: 19,355; Referee: Ismail Elfath

September 16 27	Atlanta United FC	5–2	Inter Miami	Atlanta, GA
5:00 p.m. EDT	Muyumba 36'; Miller 41' (o.g.); Lennon 44'; Giakoumakis 76'; Wolff 89'	Report	Campana 25', 53' (pen.)	Stadium: Mercedes-Benz Stadium; Attendance: 71,635; Referee: Jair Marrufo

September 20 28	Inter Miami	4–0	Toronto FC	Fort Lauderdale, FL
7:30 p.m. EDT	Farías 45+3'; Taylor 54', 87'; Cremaschi 73'	Report		Stadium: DRV PNK Stadium; Attendance: 19,659; Referee: Drew Fischer

September 24 29	Orlando City SC	1–1	Inter Miami	Orlando, FL
7:30 p.m. EDT	McGuire 66'	Report	Ruiz 52'	Stadium: Exploria Stadium; Attendance: 25,527; Referee: Armando Villarreal

September 30 30	Inter Miami	1–1	New York City FC	Fort Lauderdale, FL
8:30 p.m. EDT	Avilés 90+5'	Report	Rodríguez 77'	Stadium: DRV PNK Stadium; Attendance: 20,135; Referee: Victor Rivas

October 4 31	Chicago Fire FC	4–1	Inter Miami	Chicago, IL
8:30 p.m. EDT	Shaqiri 49', 73'; Haile-Selassie 62', 66'	Report	Martínez 53' (pen.)	Stadium: Soldier Field; Attendance: 62,124; Referee: Joseph Dickerson

October 7 32	Inter Miami	0–1	FC Cincinnati	Fort Lauderdale, FL
7:30 p.m. EDT		Report	Barreal 78'	Stadium: DRV PNK Stadium; Attendance: 20,344; Referee: Rubiel Vazquez

October 18 33	Inter Miami	2–2	Charlotte FC	Fort Lauderdale, FL
8:00 p.m. EDT	Stefanelli 45+6'; Robinson 84'	Report	Copetti 45'; Vargas 52'	Stadium: DRV PNK Stadium; Attendance: 20,344; Referee: Lukasz Szpala
Note: The match was originally scheduled for August 20, but was postponed due to Inter Miami's participation in the Leagues Cup final.

October 21 34	Charlotte FC	1–0	Inter Miami	Charlotte, NC
6:00 p.m. EDT	Vargas 13'	Report		Stadium: Bank of America Stadium; Attendance: 66,101; Referee: Guido Gonzales Jr.

=== U.S. Open Cup ===
April 26 Third round	Miami FC (USLC) (Florida)	2–2 (a.e.t.) (3–5 p)	(Florida) Inter Miami (MLS)	Miami, FL
7:30 p.m. EDT	Sorto 3'; Yedlin 116' (o.g.)	Report	Borgelin 89'; Sailor 118'	Stadium: Riccardo Silva Stadium; Attendance: 12,099; Referee: Elton García
	Penalties
	Hernández (penalty scored); Craig (penalty scored); Salazar (penalty scored); Telfer (penalty missed)		(penalty scored) Martínez; (penalty scored) Ulloa; (penalty scored) Negri; (penalty scored) Mota; (penalty scored) Miller

May 9 Round of 32	Inter Miami (MLS) (Florida)	1–0	(South Carolina) Charleston Battery (USLC)	Fort Lauderdale, FL
7:00 PM EDT	Palma 48' (o.g.)	Report		Stadium: DRV PNK Stadium; Attendance: 2,726; Referee: Jonathan Bilinski

May 23 Round of 16	Inter Miami (MLS) (Florida)	2–1	(Tennessee) Nashville SC (MLS)	Fort Lauderdale, FL
7:30 PM EDT	Negri 57'; Stefanelli 73'	Report	Muyl 66'	Stadium: DRV PNK Stadium; Attendance: 2,244; Referee: Lukasz Szpala

June 7 Quarter-finals	Birmingham Legion (USLC) (Alabama)	0–1	(Florida) Inter Miami (MLS)	Birmingham, AL
		Report	Stefanelli 56'	Stadium: Protective Stadium; Attendance: 18,418; Referee: Sergii Demianchuk

August 23 Semi-finals	FC Cincinnati (MLS) (Ohio)	3–3 (a.e.t.) (4–5 p)	(Florida) Inter Miami (MLS)	Cincinnati, OH
8:00 PM EDT	Acosta 18'; Vázquez 53'; Kubo 114'	Report	Campana 68', 90+7'; Martínez 93'	Stadium: TQL Stadium; Attendance: 25,513; Referee: Joseph Dickerson
	Penalties
	Kubo (penalty scored); Arias (penalty scored); Santos (penalty scored); Miazga (penalty scored); Hagglund (penalty missed)		(penalty scored) Messi; (penalty scored) Farías; (penalty scored) Ruiz; (penalty scored) Martínez; (penalty scored) Cremaschi

September 27 Final	Inter Miami (MLS) (Florida)	1–2	(Texas) Houston Dynamo FC (MLS)	Fort Lauderdale, FL
8:30 PM EDT	Martínez 90+2'	Report	Dorsey 24'; Bassi 33' (pen.)	Stadium: DRV PNK Stadium; Attendance: 20,288; Referee: Jon Freemon

=== Leagues Cup ===
==== Group stage (South 3) ====
Pos	Team	Pld	W	PW	PL	L	GF	GA	GD	Pts	Qualification	MIA	CAZ	ATL
1	(United States) Inter Miami CF	2	2	0	0	0	6	1	+5	6	Advance to knockout stage	—	—	4–0
2	(Mexico) Cruz Azul	2	0	1	0	1	2	3	−1	2	Advance to knockout stage	1–2	—	1–1
3	(United States) Atlanta United FC	2	0	0	1	1	1	5	−4	1		—	—	—

Source: Leagues Cup
Rules for classification: Tiebreakers

July 21 Group stage	Inter Miami (United States)	2–1	(Mexico) Cruz Azul	Fort Lauderdale, FL
8:00 pm ET	Taylor 44'; Messi 90+4'	Report	Antuna 54'	Stadium: DRV PNK Stadium; Attendance: 20,512; Referee: Saíd Martínez

July 25 Group stage	Inter Miami (United States)	4–0	(United States) Atlanta United FC	Fort Lauderdale, FL
7:30 pm ET	Messi 8', 22'; Taylor 44', 53'; McVey (red card) 84'	Report	Almada (penalty missed) 86'	Stadium: DRV PNK Stadium; Attendance: 19,758; Referee: Mario Escobar

==== Knockout round ====
August 2 Round of 32	Inter Miami (United States)	3–1	(United States) Orlando City SC	Fort Lauderdale, FL
8:00 pm ET	Messi 7', 72'; Martínez 51' (pen.)	Report	Araújo 17'	Stadium: DRV PNK Stadium; Attendance: 20,181; Referee: Iván Barton

August 6 Round of 16	FC Dallas (United States)	4–4 (3–5 p)	(United States) Inter Miami	Frisco, TX
9:30 pm ET	Quignón 37'; Kamungo 45'; Velasco 63'; Taylor 68' (o.g.)	Report	Messi 6', 85'; Cremaschi 65'; Farfan 80' (o.g.)	Stadium: Toyota Stadium; Attendance: 19,096; Referee: César Ramos
	Penalties
	Arriola (penalty scored); Pomykal (penalty missed); Quignón (penalty scored); Ferreira (penalty scored)		(penalty scored) Messi; (penalty scored) Busquets; (penalty scored) Campana; (penalty scored) Miller; (penalty scored) Cremaschi

August 11 Quarter-finals	Inter Miami (United States)	4–0	(United States) Charlotte FC	Fort Lauderdale, FL
8:30 pm ET	Martínez 12' (pen.); Taylor 32'; Malanda 78' (o.g.); Messi 86'	Report		Stadium: DRV PNK Stadium; Attendance: 20,368; Referee: Ismail Elfath

August 15 Semi-finals	Philadelphia Union (United States)	1–4	(United States) Inter Miami	Chester, PA
7:00 pm ET	Bedoya 73'	Report	Martínez 3'; Messi 20'; Alba 45+3'; Ruiz 84'	Stadium: Subaru Park; Attendance: 19,778; Referee: Daniel Quintero Huitrón

August 19 Final	Nashville SC (United States)	1–1 (9–10 p)	(United States) Inter Miami	Nashville, TN
9:00 pm ET	Picault 57'	Report	Messi 23'	Stadium: Geodis Park; Attendance: 30,109; Referee: Ismail Elfath
	Penalties
	Mukhtar (penalty scored); Leal (penalty missed); Godoy (penalty scored); Zimmerman (penalty scored); Surridge (penalty scored); Moore (penalty scored); Lovitz (penalty scored); MacNaughton (penalty scored); Davis (penalty scored); Shaffelburg (penalty scored); Panicco (penalty missed)		(penalty scored) Messi; (penalty scored) Busquets; (penalty scored) Campana; (penalty scored) Miller; (penalty missed) Ulloa; (penalty scored) Kryvtsov; (penalty scored) Alba; (penalty scored) Gómez; (penalty scored) Ruiz; (penalty scored) Yedlin; (penalty scored) Callender

== Statistics ==
=== Overall ===
Games played	34
Games won	9
Games drawn	7
Games lost	18
Points	34
Goals scored	41
Goals conceded	54
Goal difference	-13
Clean sheets	5
Yellow cards	83
Red cards	3
Worst discipline	David Ruiz (1, 6)
Best result(s)	4–0 (Toronto FC)
Worst result(s)	0–3 (St. Louis City SC)
Most appearances	Drake Callender (33)
Top scorer	Leonardo Campana (9)

Last updated: October 22, 2023
Source: IMCF Stats

Note: Only MLS regular season matches are considered.

=== Appearances and goals ===
No.	Pos	Player	Nat	MLS			Open Cup			Leagues Cup			Total		
No.	Pos	Player	Nat	App	St	G	App	St	G	App	St	G	App	St	G
Goalkeepers
1	GK	Drake Callender	(United States)	33	33	0	5	5	0	7	7	0	45	45	0
29	GK	CJ dos Santos	(United States)	1	1	0	0	0	0	0	0	0	1	1	0
~~21~~	GK	Nick Marsman (Note: Player transferred out during the season)	(Netherlands)	0	0	0	1	1	0	0	0	0	1	1	0
Defenders
2	DF	DeAndre Yedlin	(United States)	28	25	0	6	4	0	7	7	0	41	36	0
4	DF	Christopher McVey	(Sweden)	16	12	0	4	2	0	3	0	0	23	14	0
6	DF	Tomás Avilés	(Argentina)	11	11	1	1	1	0	0	0	0	12	12	1
15	DF	Ryan Sailor	(United States)	8	2	0	2	2	1	0	0	0	10	4	1
18	DF	Jordi Alba	(Spain)	7	5	1	1	1	0	5	4	1	13	10	2
24	DF	Ian Fray	(United States)	11	7	1	2	2	0	1	1	0	14	10	1
27	DF	Serhiy Kryvtsov	(Ukraine)	26	25	1	4	4	0	7	7	0	37	36	1
31	DF	Kamal Miller	(Canada)	22	21	0	6	6	0	7	7	0	35	34	0
32	DF	Noah Allen	(United States)	19	14	1	2	1	0	5	2	0	26	17	1
33	DF	Franco Negri	(Argentina)	16	16	1	4	3	1	0	0	0	20	19	2
62	DF	Israel Boatwright (Note: Player from Inter Miami II)	(Dominican Republic)	2	0	0	0	0	0	0	0	0	2	0	0
~~20~~	DF	Harvey Neville	(Republic of Ireland)	11	2	0	2	2	0	0	0	0	13	4	0
Midfielders
3	MF	Dixon Arroyo	(Ecuador)	24	21	1	4	2	0	7	7	0	35	30	1
5	MF	Sergio Busquets	(Spain)	11	10	0	2	2	0	7	6	0	20	18	0
7	MF	Jean Mota	(Brazil)	13	9	0	2	2	0	0	0	0	15	11	0
8	MF	Diego Gómez	(Paraguay)	5	5	1	2	2	0	5	1	0	12	8	1
11	MF	Facundo Farías	(Argentina)	11	9	3	2	1	0	0	0	0	13	10	3
13	MF	Víctor Ulloa	(Mexico)	10	2	0	2	1	0	4	0	0	16	3	0
16	MF	Robert Taylor	(Finland)	27	15	4	6	4	0	7	7	4	40	26	8
26	MF	Gregore	(Brazil)	5	5	0	0	0	0	0	0	0	5	5	0
28	MF	Edison Azcona	(Dominican Republic)	5	0	0	1	0	0	0	0	0	6	0	0
30	MF	Benjamin Cremaschi	(United States)	28	21	2	6	3	0	7	6	1	41	30	3
41	MF	David Ruiz	(Honduras)	20	14	2	4	2	0	6	1	1	30	17	3
43	MF	Lawson Sunderland	(United States)	2	1	0	0	0	0	0	0	0	2	1	0
~~8~~	MF	Bryce Duke	(United States)	7	4	0	–	–	–	–	–	–	7	4	0
~~20~~	MF	Rodolfo Pizarro	(Mexico)	13	11	0	2	0	0	–	–	–	15	11	0
Forwards
9	FW	Leonardo Campana	(Ecuador)	26	17	9	4	3	2	7	1	0	37	21	11
10	FW	Lionel Messi	(Argentina)	6	4	1	1	1	0	7	6	10	14	11	11
14	FW	Corentin Jean	(France)	15	12	1	2	2	0	0	0	0	17	14	1
17	FW	Josef Martínez	(Venezuela)	27	20	7	6	3	2	7	6	3	40	29	12
19	FW	Robbie Robinson	(United States)	9	3	1	0	0	0	3	1	0	12	4	1
22	FW	Nicolás Stefanelli	(Argentina)	25	17	2	5	3	2	0	0	0	30	20	4
~~11~~	FW	Ariel Lassiter	(Costa Rica)	7	0	0	–	–	–	–	–	–	7	0	0
~~12~~	FW	Jake LaCava	(United States)	0	0	0	2	0	0	–	–	–	2	0	0
~~49~~	FW	Shanyder Borgelin	(Haiti)	10	0	1	3	1	1	0	0	0	13	1	2
Total				34		41	6		9	7		20	47		70

=== Top scorers ===
Rank	Pos.	No.	Player	MLS	Open Cup	Leagues Cup	Total
1	FW	17	(Venezuela) Josef Martínez	7	2	3	12
2	FW	9	(Ecuador) Leonardo Campana	9	2	0	11
2	FW	10	(Argentina) Lionel Messi	1	0	10	11
4	MF	16	(Finland) Robert Taylor	4	0	4	8
5	FW	22	(Argentina) Nicolás Stefanelli	2	2	0	4
6	MF	30	(United States) Benjamin Cremaschi	2	0	1	3
6	MF	11	(Argentina) Facundo Farías	3	0	0	3
6	MF	41	(Honduras) David Ruiz	2	0	1	3
9	DF	18	(Spain) Jordi Alba	1	0	1	2
9	FW	~~49~~	(Haiti) Shanyder Borgelin	1	1	0	2
9	DF	33	(Argentina) Franco Negri	1	1	0	2
12	MF	32	(United States) Noah Allen	1	0	0	1
12	MF	3	(Ecuador) Dixon Arroyo	1	0	0	1
12	DF	6	(Argentina) Tomás Avilés	1	0	0	1
12	DF	24	(United States) Ian Fray	1	0	0	1
12	MF	8	(Paraguay) Diego Gómez	1	0	0	1
12	FW	14	(France) Corentin Jean	1	0	0	1
12	DF	27	(Ukraine) Serhiy Kryvtsov	1	0	0	1
12	FW	19	(United States) Robbie Robinson	1	0	0	1
12	DF	15	(United States) Ryan Sailor	0	1	0	1
Own goals				0	1	2	3
Total				41	10	22	73

=== Top assists ===
Rank	Pos.	No.	Player	MLS	Open Cup	Leagues Cup	Total
1	FW	16	(Finland) Robert Taylor	5	1	3	9
2	MF	30	(United States) Benjamin Cremaschi	4	1	1	6
3	FW	10	(Argentina) Lionel Messi	2	2	1	5
4	FW	9	(Ecuador) Leonardo Campana	3	0	1	4
4	MF	7	(Brazil) Jean Mota	3	1	0	4
4	DF	2	(United States) DeAndre Yedlin	2	0	2	4
7	FW	17	(Venezuela) Josef Martínez	1	0	2	3
8	DF	18	(Spain) Jordi Alba	0	0	2	2
8	MF	32	(United States) Noah Allen	2	0	0	2
8	MF	11	(Argentina) Facundo Farías	1	1	0	2
8	FW	14	(France) Corentin Jean	0	2	0	2
8	DF	33	(Argentina) Franco Negri	1	1	0	2
13	DF	6	(Argentina) Tomás Avilés	1	0	0	1
13	MF	5	(Spain) Sergio Busquets	1	0	0	1
13	MF	26	(Brazil) Gregore	1	0	0	1
13	DF	27	(Ukraine) Serhiy Kryvtsov	0	0	1	1
13	MF	~~20~~	(Mexico) Rodolfo Pizarro	1	0	0	1
13	FW	19	(United States) Robbie Robinson	0	0	1	1
13	MF	41	(Honduras) David Ruiz	1	0	0	1
Total				29	9	14	52

=== Clean sheets ===
No.	Name	MLS	Open Cup	Leagues Cup	Total
1	(United States) Drake Callender	5	1	2	8
~~21~~	(Netherlands) Nick Marsman	0	1	0	1
