= 2023 Leagues Cup final =

Soccer match in Nashville, Tennessee, U.S.

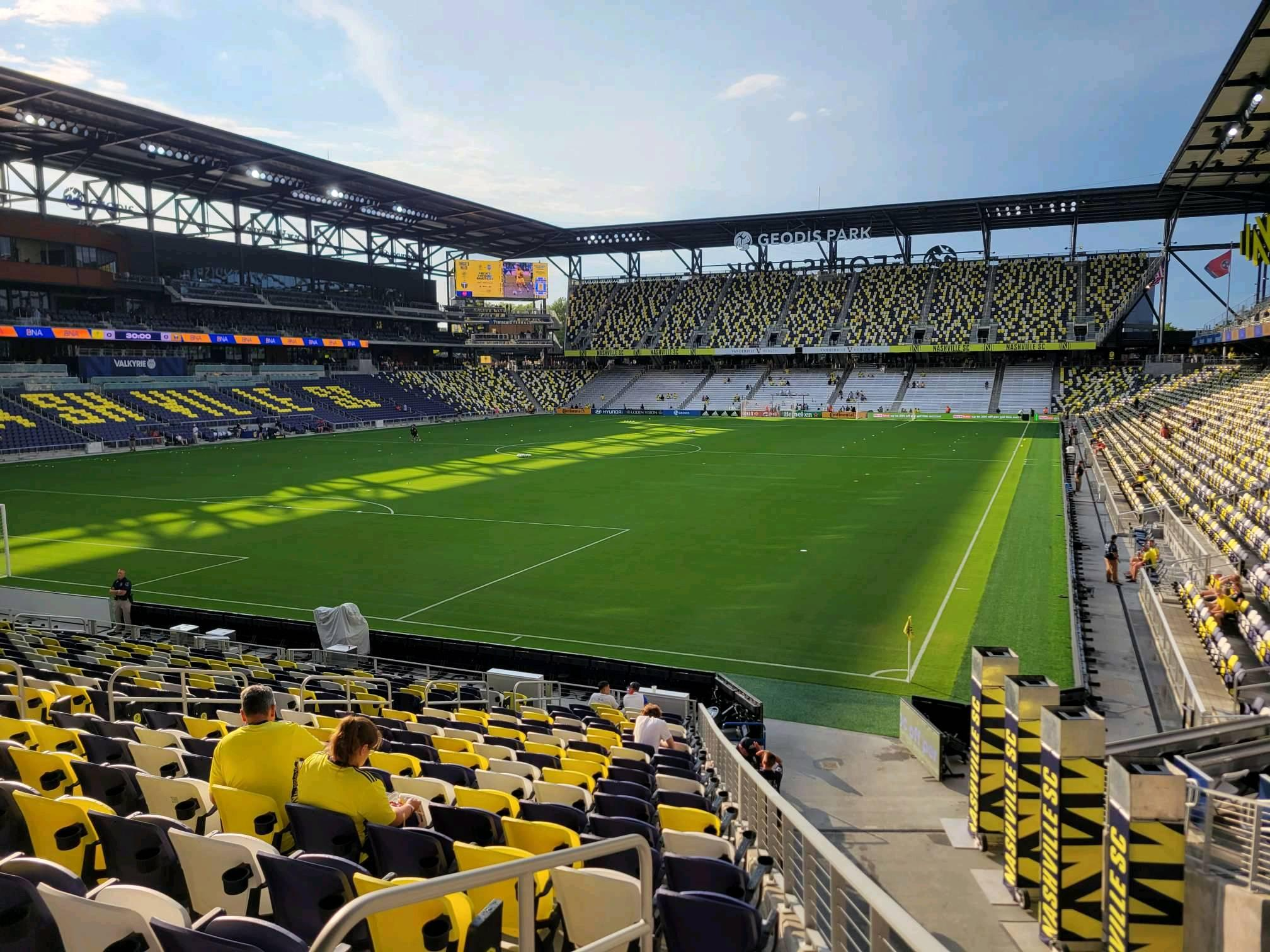
- Geodis Park in Nashville hosted the final.
- Event: 2023 Leagues Cup
Nashville SC	Inter Miami CF
(United States)	(United States)
1	1
- Inter Miami CF won 10–9 on penalties
- Date: August 19, 2023
- Venue: Geodis Park, Nashville, Tennessee
- Man of the Match: Drake Callender (Inter Miami CF)
- Referee: Ismail Elfath (United States)
- Attendance: 30,109
- Weather: Clear, 80 °F (27 °C)

The 2023 Leagues Cup final was the final match of the third edition of the Leagues Cup, a soccer tournament played between clubs from Major League Soccer (MLS) and Liga MX. The match was played on August 19, 2023, at Geodis Park in Nashville, Tennessee, United States. It was contested by hosts Nashville SC and Inter Miami CF, both MLS expansion teams who had yet to win a competitive trophy since joining the league in 2020.

Miami took the lead in the first half through a goal from Lionel Messi, while Fafà Picault equalized after half-time for Nashville; the match remained tied 1–1 after regulation time. In the ensuing penalty shoot-out, Inter Miami CF won 10–9 with the final round contested by the two goalkeepers for both teams. Miami's goalkeeper Drake Callender won man of the match honors for his play throughout the match, including his save on Elliot Panicco in the penalty shoot-out and his successful penalty to win the title for his team.

== Road to the final ==
The Leagues Cup is an annual soccer tournament for clubs from Major League Soccer (MLS) in the United States and Canada and Liga MX of Mexico. The 2023 edition, the third in the tournament's history, was the first to be expanded to include all 47 teams from the two leagues. MLS and Liga MX both paused their regular seasons for the duration of the Leagues Cup, which began with a group stage in mid-July and would conclude with the final in mid-August. The entire tournament was hosted in the United States and Canada. Both finalists qualified for the 2024 CONCACAF Champions Cup.

Both finalists, Nashville SC and Inter Miami CF, entered MLS as expansion teams in the 2020 season. They met in the play-in round of the 2020 MLS Cup Playoffs, where Nashville defeated Miami. The most recent of their six regular season meetings was on May 17, 2023, which Nashville hosted and won 2–1. Six days later, the two sides met again in the U.S. Open Cup round of 16, which Inter Miami CF hosted and won 2–1. The only previous U.S. club to play in a Leagues Cup final was Seattle Sounders FC, who lost in the 2021 edition. Both finalists had regular season matches scheduled for the same weekend as the Leagues Cup final that were postponed to October due to their advancement in the tournament.

=== Nashville SC ===
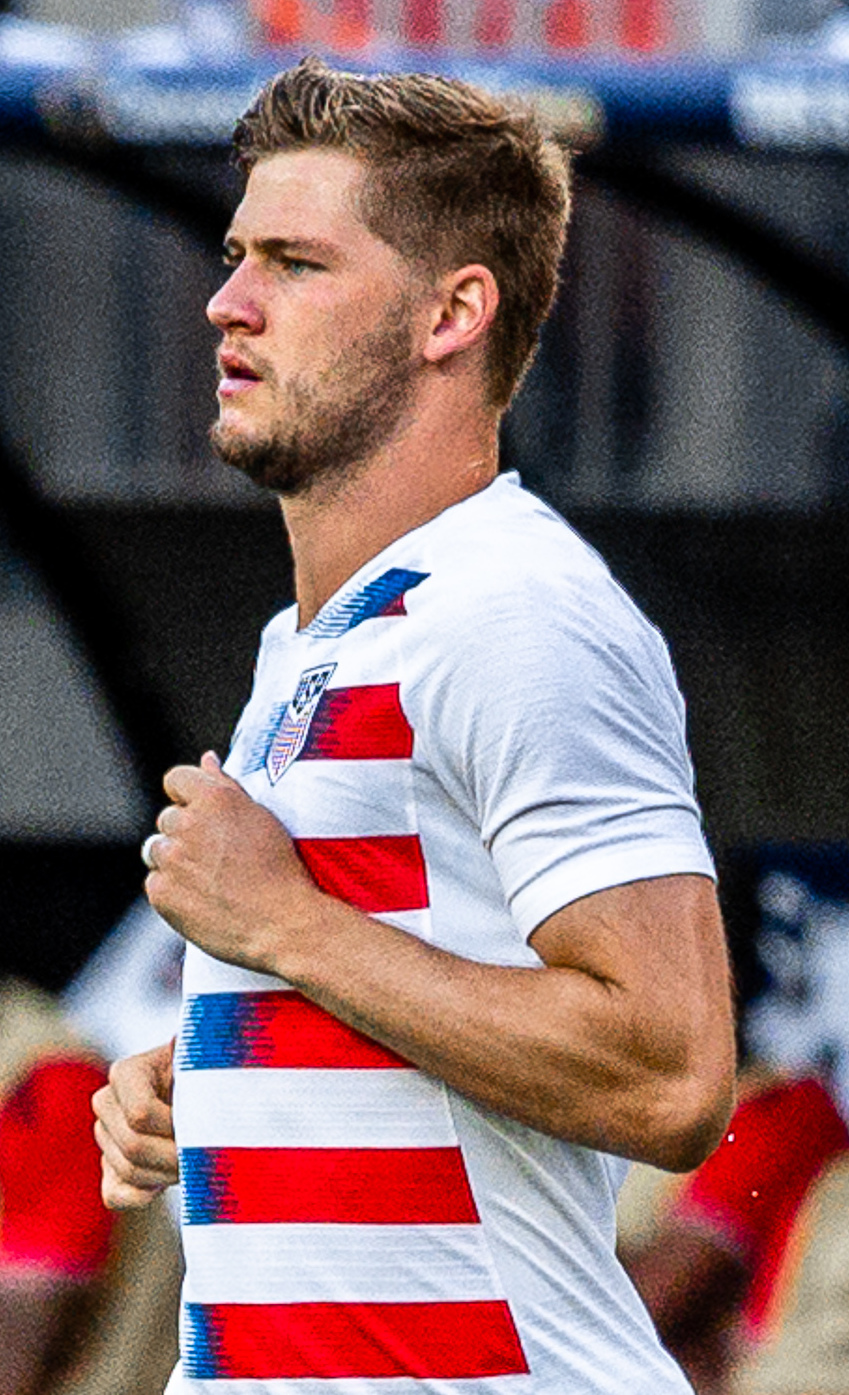
Nashville SC captain Walker Zimmerman, who scored in the round of 16 and round of 32

Nashville SC had qualified for the MLS Cup Playoffs in its first three seasons in the league and had advanced as far as the quarterfinals in the U.S. Open Cup, but had yet to win a trophy. The team finished tenth in the 2022 regular season standings and were seeded into the Central 4 group alongside Toluca and the Colorado Rapids. Prior to the Leagues Cup break, Nashville SC were fifth in the Supporters' Shield race but had lost five of their six most recent matches.

In their opening match against Colorado, Nashville won 2–1 with goals from substitutes Hany Mukhtar and Jacob Shaffelburg in the second half before conceding late to the Rapids. The team gained and lost its lead twice in the first half of their match against Toluca, which included a penalty awarded in stoppage time by the video assistant referee (VAR). Toluca scored again the second half and won 4–3; Nashville finished second in the group and advanced to the knockout stage after Colorado's 4–1 loss to Toluca.

The team opened the knockout round against FC Cincinnati, the leaders in the 2023 Supporters' Shield race and host of the match. After a scoreless first half, Nashville took the lead through a tap-in by Anibal Godoy but conceded a penalty kick that was converted by Brandon Vázquez. The match finished at 1–1 in regulation time and was immediately followed by a penalty shoot-out that Nashville won 5–4 after a save on Matt Miazga's shot. The team returned home to host Mexico's Club América in the round of 16; Walker Zimmerman scored the opening goal for Nashville in the second half, which was followed by an equalizer from Diego Valdés for América. In stoppage time, América earned a penalty that Julián Quiñones converted for a 2–1 lead, but Nashville's debutant striker Sam Surridge equalized in the ninth minute to send the match to a penalty shoot-out. Nashville manager Gary Smith substituted goalkeeper Elliot Panicco in for Joe Willis, repeating a strategy used in the round of 32 shoot-out. In the sixth round, a shot by Nashville defender Jack Maher was initially saved by Luis Malagón and triggered a celebration from América and several pitch invaders. A check by the VAR determined that Malagón had illegally left the touchline before Maher had taken his shot, which necessitated a retake. Maher's retaken penalty was scored and extended the shoot-out, which ultimately ended with a 6–5 win for Nashville after Jonathan dos Santos missed for América and Daniel Lovitz converted.

Nashville SC advanced to the quarterfinals and won 5–0 against Minnesota United FC, who were down to 10 players after defender D. J. Taylor was sent off with a red card in the 34th minute. The team's two first-half goals were created by Jacob Shaffelburg's crosses into the box, which found Shaq Moore and Teal Bunbury; three goals within a nine-minute span followed after half-time. Goalkeeper Joe Willis left the team after the quarterfinal match for personal reasons and was replaced as starter by Panicco. Nashville then defeated CF Monterrey 2–0 in the semifinals with goals from substitutes Surridge and Picault in the second half while the team managed fatigue and injuries. It was the first defeat for Monterrey against an MLS team in a knockout competition; Monterrey had traveled over 7,600 miles (12,200 km) during the tournament, which the club's president complained was an unfair advantage for MLS teams.

=== Inter Miami CF ===
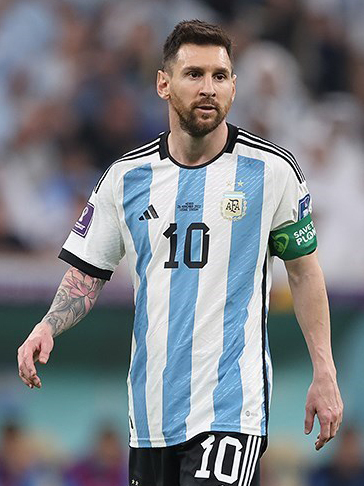
Lionel Messi made his debut for Inter Miami CF in the 2023 Leagues Cup

Inter Miami CF entered MLS as an expansion team in 2020 and had yet to advance to a prior tournament final. The team finished twelfth in the 2022 regular season standings and were seeded into the South 3 group. Before the Leagues Cup break, Miami were at the bottom of the Eastern Conference in regular season play with 18 points in 22 matches and on an 11-match winless streak. During the 2023 summer transfer window, the club signed forward Lionel Messi, midfielder Sergio Busquets, and defender Jordi Alba, all former FC Barcelona players and among the world's best in their positions; Inter Miami CF also signed a trio of young South American prospects to under-22 Designated Player contracts and offloaded veteran players to keep salary costs manageable and under the cap. Head coach Phil Neville was fired on June 1 and temporarily replaced by assistant Javier Morales until Gerardo "Tata" Martino joined in July.

To prepare for the Leagues Cup, an additional 3,000 seats were added to DRV PNK Stadium, the temporary home of Inter Miami CF in the suburb of Fort Lauderdale. Miami made their cup debut against Cruz Azul and took the lead through a Robert Taylor goal before half-time, but Uriel Antuna equalized for Cruz Azul in the 65th minute. Messi entered the match as a substitute prior to the equalizer and scored his first goal for the club—a free kick in stoppage time—to clinch a 2–1 win for Miami. Inter Miami CF then won 4–0 at home against Atlanta United FC, which allowed them to clinch the top spot in their group. Messi scored the first two goals of the match, which was followed by a pair from Taylor; the duo also provided an assist on each other's goals and formed an attacking partnership for the team.

Inter Miami CF remained at home to play against in-state rivals Orlando City SC in the round of 32 on August 2 after the match was delayed by 95 minutes due to lightning. Two goals from Messi and a converted penalty by Josef Martínez gave the home side a 3–1 victory. The team advanced to the round of 16 and faced FC Dallas four days later in their first away match of the tournament, which was played with additional security guards and in front of a mixed crowd of home supporters and Messi fans. Messi opened the scoring in the sixth minute with a strike that went to video review due to a possible offside that was ruled to have not affected the play; Dallas then equalized and took a 2–1 lead at the end of the first half with goals from Facundo Quignon and Bernard Kamungo. A third goal for Dallas was followed by a goal by Miami rookie substitute Benjamin Cremaschi and an own goal from Robert Taylor, who was tracking back on a counterattack, to make the scoreline 4–2. Messi provided an assist for Cremaschi as well as an own goal by Dallas defender Marco Farfan before scoring his second goal of the match, a free kick in the 85th minute, to close out regulation time at 4–4. Miami won 5–3 in the shoot-out over five rounds, with the only missed shot from Paxton Pomykal in the second round.

Miami then advanced to the quarterfinals and defeated Charlotte FC 4–0 at DRV PNK Stadium. Martínez opened the scoring in the twelfth minute with a penalty kick that was awarded for a foul on Dixon Arroyo; he was followed by Taylor's finish on a DeAndre Yedlin cross for a 2–0 lead at half-time. Charlotte defender Adilson Malanda then scored an own goal ahead of an advancing Leonardo Campana, who also provided an assist to Messi for his goal from close range. In the semifinals, Inter Miami CF won 4–1 on the road to the Philadelphia Union to clinch a place in the final with three goals in the first half on their first three shots. Martínez once again scored first, in the third minute, and was followed by Messi's rolling shot from distance and a stoppage-time finish by Jordi Alba on a through-ball from Taylor. Alejandro Bedoya scored a consolation goal in the 73rd minute, while Ruiz restored Miami's three-goal lead shortly before the end of the match. During their six matches in the Leagues Cup, Inter Miami CF scored 21 goals—one fewer than they did in their 22 regular season matches prior to Messi's arrival. Messi had scored in every Leagues Cup match and entered the final as the tournament's top goalscorer with nine goals, two ahead of Minnesota United FC's Bongokuhle Hlongwane.

=== Summary of results ===
Note: In all results below, the score of the finalist is given first (H: home; A: away). All matches were decided through a penalty shoot-out (p) if scores were tied after regulation time.

(United States) Nashville SC		Round	(United States) Inter Miami CF	
Opponent	Result	Group stage	Opponent	Result
(United States) Colorado Rapids	2–1 (H)	Matchday 1	(Mexico) Cruz Azul	2–1 (H)
(Mexico) Toluca	3–4 (H)	Matchday 2	(United States) Atlanta United FC	4–0 (H)
Bye		Matchday 3	Bye	
Group Central 4 runners-up: Pos / Team / Pld / Pts; 1 / (Mexico) Toluca / 2 / 6; 2 / (United States) Nashville SC / 2 / 3; 3 / (United States) Colorado Rapids / 2 / 0; Source: Leagues Cup		Final standings	Group South 3 winners: Pos / Team / Pld / Pts; 1 / (United States) Inter Miami CF / 2 / 6; 2 / (Mexico) Cruz Azul / 2 / 2; 3 / (United States) Atlanta United FC / 2 / 1; Source: Leagues Cup	
Opponent	Result	Knockout stage	Opponent	Result
(United States) FC Cincinnati	1–1 (5–4 p) (A)	Round of 32	(United States) Orlando City SC	3–1 (H)
(Mexico) América	2–2 (6–5 p) (H)	Round of 16	(United States) FC Dallas	4–4 (5–3 p) (A)
(United States) Minnesota United FC	5–0 (H)	Quarterfinals	(United States) Charlotte FC	4–0 (H)
(Mexico) Monterrey	2–0 (H)	Semifinals	(United States) Philadelphia Union	4–1 (A)

== Venue ==
The Leagues Cup final was played at Geodis Park, a 30,000-seat stadium in Nashville, Tennessee. The stadium is the largest soccer-specific venue in the United States and home to Nashville SC, who hosted due to their higher finish in the 2022 Supporters' Shield standings. Ticket sales for the final began with access for season ticket holders on the morning of August 16 and the general public in the afternoon. By the end of the day, resale tickets on Ticketmaster and secondary markets ranged from $484 to $12,000. On the day of the final, ticket prices ranged from $285 to $3,748 on secondary markets.

== Broadcasting ==
The final was broadcast worldwide in English and Spanish on MLS Season Pass, a streaming service run by Apple as part of their Apple TV+ brand. The English commentary team comprised play-by-play commentator Jake Zivin, color analyst Taylor Twellman, sideline reporter Katie Witham, and a studio team led by host Maurice Edu. The Spanish team included Andrés Agulla for play-by-play, Marcelo Balboa, and Antonella González. TelevisaUnivision also produced a Spanish broadcast to be aired on television in the United States by TUDN and UniMás and in Mexico on Canal 5 and TUDN. This broadcast was also streamed on Vix in Mexico.

== Match ==
=== Summary ===
The Leagues Cup final was played in front of a sellout crowd of 30,109 at Geodis Park in Nashville, including several hundred Inter Miami fans who had traveled from Florida as well as other supporters of the club. MLS commissioner Don Garber, Inter Miami part-owner David Beckham, and Nashville SC minority owners Giannis Antetokounmpo and Reese Witherspoon were among those in attendance. Nashville head coach Gary Smith opted to use a 4–4–2 formation and give Sam Surridge his first start in place of Teal Bunbury; Gerardo Martino had an unchanged starting lineup from the semifinals, arranged in a 4–3–3. Singer Colbie Caillat performed the U.S. national anthem prior to the match, which began at 8:15 p.m. Central Time with the temperature at 80 °F (27 °C).

Nashville began the match with a strong defensive shape and contained pressure from Miami, but eventually conceded the opening goal to Lionel Messi in the 23rd minute. Messi dribbled around defender Walker Zimmerman and took his shot between three players to beat Elliot Panicco. A corner kick for Nashville in the 57th minute was headed in by Fafà Picault for the equalizing goal. Despite having the advantage in shots and shots on goal, Nashville was unable to take the lead as the match ended 1–1 in regulation time.

In the early rounds of the shoot-out, only Randall Leal of Nashville and Víctor Ulloa of Miami missed their shots. Jordi Alba scored his first career shoot-out goal; Ulloa's miss sent the shoot-out into sudden death rounds. The deciding eleventh round was contested by the two goalkeepers: Drake Callender converted his and then saved Panicco's to win the shoot-out by a 10–9 scoreline.

=== Details ===
August 19, 2023
8:00 p.m. CDT

Nashville SC (United States)	1–1	(United States) Inter Miami CF
Picault 57'	Report	Messi 23'
Penalties
Mukhtar (penalty scored); Leal (penalty missed); Godoy (penalty scored); Zimmerman (penalty scored); Surridge (penalty scored); Moore (penalty scored); Lovitz (penalty scored); MacNaughton (penalty scored); Davis (penalty scored); Shaffelburg (penalty scored); Panicco (penalty missed)	9–10	(penalty scored) Messi; (penalty scored) Busquets; (penalty scored) Campana; (penalty scored) Miller; (penalty missed) Ulloa; (penalty scored) Kryvtsov; (penalty scored) Alba; (penalty scored) Gómez; (penalty scored) Ruiz; (penalty scored) Yedlin; (penalty scored) Callender

Geodis Park, Nashville, Tennessee
Attendance: 30,109
Referee: Ismail Elfath (United States)

Nashville SC	Inter Miami CF

GK	30	(United States) Elliot Panicco
RB	18	(United States) Shaq Moore
CB	25	(United States) Walker Zimmerman (c)
CB	3	(Canada) Lukas MacNaughton
LB	2	(United States) Daniel Lovitz
RM	19	(United States) Alex Muyl		(substituted off) 82'
CM	6	(United States) Dax McCarty		(substituted off) 72'
CM	20	(Panama) Aníbal Godoy	(yellow card) 54'
LM	7	(Haiti) Fafà Picault		(substituted off) 72'
CF	9	(England) Sam Surridge
CF	10	(Germany) Hany Mukhtar
Substitutes:
GK	1	(United States) Joe Willis
GK	67	(United States) Ben Martino
DF	5	(United States) Jack Maher
DF	16	(England) Laurence Wyke
DF	22	(United States) Josh Bauer
DF	23	(United States) Taylor Washington
MF	8	(Costa Rica) Randall Leal		(substituted on) 82'
MF	26	(United States) Luke Haakenson
MF	27	(Cameroon) Brian Anunga
MF	54	(United States) Sean Davis		(substituted on) 72'
FW	12	(United States) Teal Bunbury
FW	14	(Canada) Jacob Shaffelburg		(substituted on) 72'
Manager:
(England) Gary Smith

GK	1	(United States) Drake Callender
RB	2	(United States) DeAndre Yedlin
CB	27	(Ukraine) Serhiy Kryvtsov
CB	31	(Canada) Kamal Miller
LB	18	(Spain) Jordi Alba
DM	5	(Spain) Sergio Busquets
CM	30	(United States) Benjamin Cremaschi		(substituted off) 68'
CM	3	(Ecuador) Dixon Arroyo		(substituted off) 81'
RW	10	(Argentina) Lionel Messi (c)
CF	17	(Venezuela) Josef Martínez		(substituted off) 68'
LW	16	(Finland) Robert Taylor		(substituted off) 81'
Substitutes:
GK	29	(United States) CJ dos Santos
GK	99	(United States) Cole Jensen
DF	4	(Sweden) Christopher McVey
DF	6	(Argentina) Tomás Avilés
DF	20	(Republic of Ireland) Harvey Neville
DF	32	(United States) Noah Allen
MF	8	(Paraguay) Diego Gómez		(substituted on) 68'
MF	11	(Argentina) Facundo Farías
MF	13	(Mexico) Víctor Ulloa	(yellow card) 89'	(substituted on) 81'
MF	41	(Honduras) David Ruiz		(substituted on) 81'
FW	9	(Ecuador) Leonardo Campana		(substituted on) 68'
FW	19	(United States) Robbie Robinson
Manager:
(Argentina) Gerardo Martino

Man of the Match:
Drake Callender (Inter Miami CF)

Assistant referees:
Corey Parker (United States)
Kyle Atkins (United States)
Fourth official:
Pierre-Luc Lauzière (Canada)
Video assistant referee:
Óscar Macías (Mexico)
Assistant video assistant referee:
Victor Rivas (United States)

Match rules

- 90 minutes of play with no extra time.
- Penalty shoot-out if scores still level.
- Maximum of twelve named substitutes.
- Maximum of five substitutions to be made during three windows (including half-time). Two additional substitutions were available for concussed players and did not count towards the five substitutions or three windows.

== Post-match ==
As winner of the Leagues Cup final, Inter Miami CF earned $2 million in prize money and qualified directly for the round of 16 in the 2024 CONCACAF Champions Cup. It was the first trophy to be won by the club. Miami goalkeeper Drake Callender was named the man of the match for his saves and deciding penalty in the shoot-out. Lionel Messi was awarded the Best Player of the tournament and was also the top scorer with 10 goals; it was the seventh consecutive match that he had scored in since arriving at Inter Miami CF a month earlier.

The Leagues Cup trophy was presented to Messi, who lifted it with former Miami captain DeAndre Yedlin after giving him the captain's armband. It was the 44th trophy of Messi's professional career, which set the record for most decorated player in history as he surpassed former Barcelona teammate Dani Alves. The Leagues Cup was also the 42nd tournament final that Messi had played in and the 30th his team had won.

The two finalists met again in the CONCACAF Champions Cup round of 16 in March 2024. The first leg in Nashville was a 2–2 draw and was followed by a 3–1 home victory for Inter Miami CF, who advanced with a 5–3 aggregate score.
