= Robbie Robinson (soccer) =

American soccer player (born 1998)

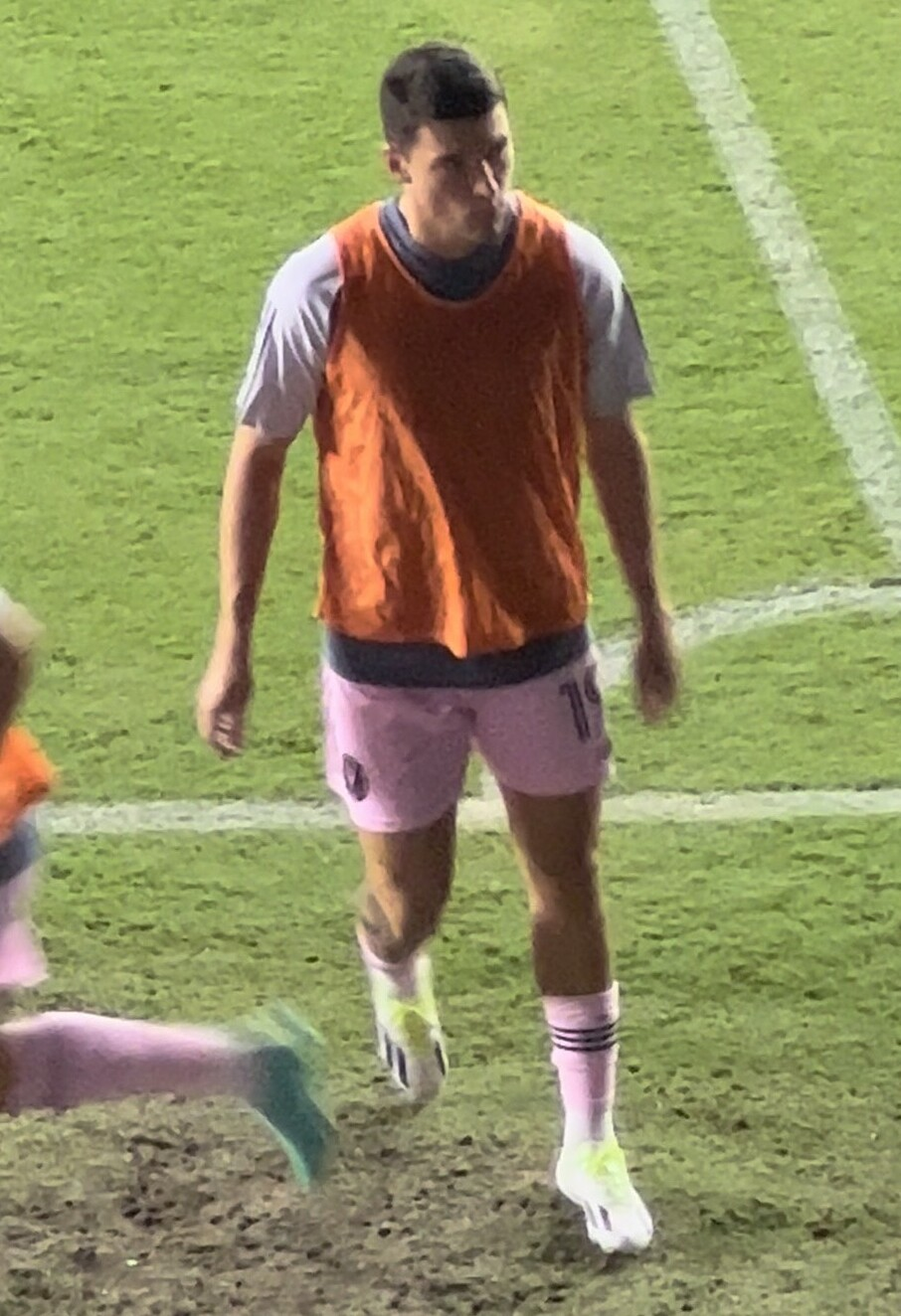
- Robinson training with Inter Miami in 2023

Personal information
- Full name: Robert Robinson Belmar
- Date of birth: December 17, 1998 (age 27)
- Place of birth: Camden, South Carolina, United States
- Height: 6 ft 1 in (1.85 m)
- Positions: Forward; winger

Youth career
- 2011–2014: Camden Military Academy
- 2014–2017: Charleston Battery

College career
Years	Team	Apps	(Gls)
2017–2019	Clemson Tigers	47	(24)

Senior career*
Years	Team	Apps	(Gls)
2017	Charleston Battery	0	(0)
2020–2024	Inter Miami	53	(6)
2022	→ Inter Miami II (loan)	2	(0)
Total		55	(6)
- * Club domestic league appearances and goals

Robert "Robbie" Robinson Belmar (born December 17, 1998) is an American former professional soccer player who played as a forward or winger.

== Club career ==
=== Charleston Battery ===
Robinson signed with United Soccer League side Charleston Battery on an academy contract ahead of their 2017 season. He made his professional debut on June 14, 2017, as an 88th-minute substitute during a 3–2 loss to Atlanta United FC in the 2017 U.S. Open Cup.

=== Clemson Tigers ===
Robinson played college soccer at Clemson from 2017 to 2019. He scored his first collegiate goal on September 22, 2017, against Pittsburgh.

On January 4, 2020, Robinson won the Hermann Trophy, an award for the top college soccer player in the United States. On May 20, 2020, Robinson was named the ACC Male Athlete of the Year, an award for the top male player across all sports in the Atlantic Coast Conference. In the award's 67-year history, Robinson was the first male soccer player to win the award.

=== Inter Miami CF ===
In December 2019, he was announced as having signed with Major League Soccer as a Generation Adidas player, and would be available in the 2020 MLS SuperDraft. Robinson was selected 1st overall in the 2020 MLS SuperDraft by Inter Miami.

He made his MLS debut for Inter Miami against Los Angeles FC on March 1, 2020.

On June 30, 2024, Robinson's contract with Inter Miami was terminated by mutual consent after the player had failed to make a single appearance during the season to date.

=== Retirement ===
On April 17, 2025, Robinson announced on his Instagram page that he had decided to retire from professional soccer due to injuries.

== International career ==
Robinson was eligible to play for Chile and for the United States, since he was born in the United States to an American father and a Chilean mother.

On August 23, 2021, he was called up to the Chile national team. Days later, he arrived at Santiago before three matches for the 2022 FIFA World Cup qualification. On September 1, the day before the first match against Brazil, he received the nationalization documents and his Chilean passport. However, on the same day, Robinson returned to Miami citing he needed more time to decide which country to represent.

== Career statistics ==
=== Club ===
As of April 15, 2024

Appearances and goals by club, season, and competition
Club	Season	League			U.S. Open Cup		Continental		Other		Total	
Club	Season	Division	Apps	Goals	Apps	Goals	Apps	Goals	Apps	Goals	Apps	Goals
Charleston Battery	2017	USL	0	0	1	0	—		—		1	0
Inter Miami	2020	MLS	12	0	—		—		—		12	0
Inter Miami	2021	MLS	24	4	—		—		—		24	4
Inter Miami	2022	MLS	8	1	2	1	—		—		10	2
Inter Miami	2023	MLS	9	1	0	0	—		3 (Note: Appearance in Leagues Cup)	0	12	1
Inter Miami	2024	MLS	0	0	—		0	0	—		0	0
Inter Miami	Total		53	6	2	1	0	0	3	0	58	7
Career total			53	6	3	1	0	0	3	0	59	7

== Honors ==
Inter Miami

- Leagues Cup: 2023

Individual

- Hermann Trophy: 2019
- ACC Athlete of the Year: 2020
