= Serhiy Kryvtsov =

Ukrainian footballer (born 1991)

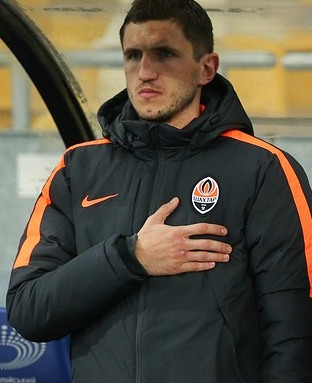
- Kryvtsov with Shakhtar Donetsk in 2015

Personal information
- Full name: Serhiy Andriyovych Kryvtsov
- Date of birth: 15 March 1991 (age 35)
- Place of birth: Zaporizhzhia, Ukrainian SSR, Soviet Union (Now Ukraine)
- Height: 1.86 m (6 ft 1 in)
- Position: Defender

Youth career
- 2004–2007: Metalurh Zaporizhzhia

Senior career*
Years	Team	Apps	(Gls)
2007–2008	Metalurh-2 Zaporizhzhia	7	(0)
2008–2010	Metalurh Zaporizhzhia	44	(2)
2010–2022	Shakhtar Donetsk	145	(11)
2023–2024	Inter Miami	43	(2)

International career^{‡}
2006–2007	Ukraine U16	8	(0)
2006–2007	Ukraine U17	18	(2)
2009	Ukraine U18	6	(0)
2009	Ukraine U19	5	(0)
2009–2012	Ukraine U21	29	(2)
2011–2023	Ukraine	32	(0)
Medal record
Men's football
Representing Ukraine
UEFA European Under-19 Championship
Winner	2009 Ukraine
- * Club domestic league appearances and goals as of 00:20, 7 July 2024 (UTC) ‡ National team caps and goals as of 16 June 2023

Serhiy Andriyovych Kryvtsov (Ukrainian: Сергі́й Андрі́йович Кривцо́в; born 15 March 1991) is a Ukrainian former professional footballer who played as a defender for the Ukraine national team.

== Club career ==
=== Metalurh Zaporizhzhia ===
Born in Zaporizhzhia, Ukraine, Kryvtsov is a product of the Metalurh Zaporizhzhia Youth school system, where he was trained by Viktor Tryhubov. He made his debut for the club at the age of 17 in a 1–1 draw with Chornomorets Odesa on 3 May 2008. His first goal for the club came in a 2–0 victory over Illichivets Mariupol on 27 February 2010. He left the club in May 2010 to join Shakhtar Donetsk for an undisclosed fee.

=== Shakhtar Donetsk ===
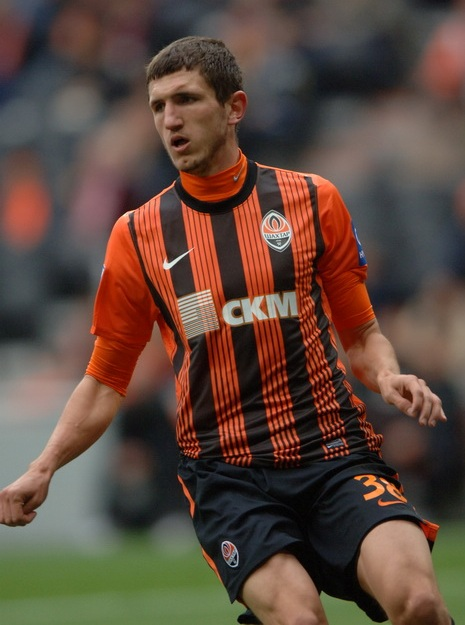
Kryvtsov playing for Shakhtar Donetsk in 2011

On 11 May 2010, Kryvtsov, along with Taras Stepanenko, signed for FC Shakhtar Donetsk from Metalurh on a five-year deal. His first appearance for the club came on 10 November 2010 in a 1–0 Ukrainian Cup victory over his old club, Metalurh Zaporizhzhia. He made a further two appearances in his first season, both coming in the league. Shakhtar won the treble with success in the Premier League, Cup and the Super Cup.

The following season he made six appearances for the club, five of which came in the league, as Shakhtar clinched the Premier League title and the Ukrainian Cup.

He made his first appearance of the 2012–13 season on 26 August in a 3–0 victory over Karpaty Lviv at the Donbas Arena. He played the full 90 minutes, picking up a yellow card in the 85th minute. He also played in a 3–1 victory over Dynamo Kyiv as a 70th-minute substitute, replacing the injured Oleksandr Kucher who scored twice.

=== Inter Miami ===
In January 2023, Kryvtsov joined Major League Soccer club Inter Miami on a two-year deal, with an option for a third-year extension. In his debut game for the club, Kryvtsov netted the opening goal of the match as Inter Miami defeated CF Montréal 2–0. As a result, he was named to the league's Team of the Matchday for week one.In December 2024, Inter Miami chose to not renew his contract so he left the club, before retiring from the sport in March 2026.

== International career ==
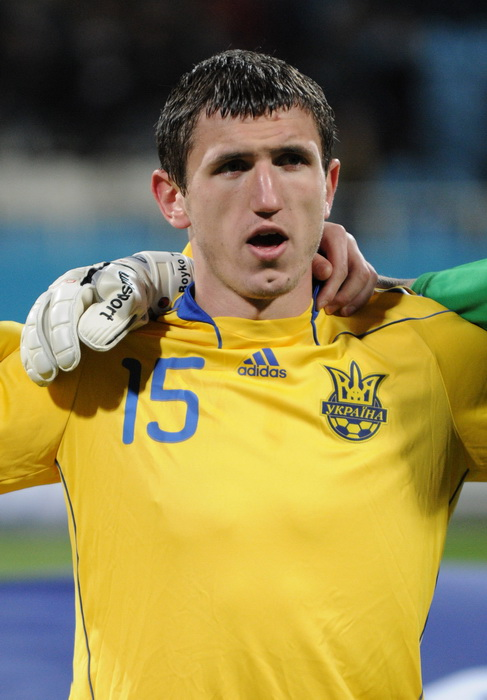
Serhiy with Ukraine in 2010

Kryvtsov was a member of the Ukraine U21 and the Ukraine U19 youth teams. He was part of the Ukraine under-19 team that won the 2009 UEFA European Under-19 Championship. He made his first appearance for the senior national side in a 4–0 friendly defeat to Czech Republic on 6 September 2011, playing the full 90 minutes.

Kryvtsov was included in the Ukraine national team squad at the delayed UEFA Euro 2020, held in 2021. He played in two matches at the tournament as Ukraine reached the quarter-finals, losing 4–0 to England.

== Career statistics ==
=== Club ===
As of match played 7 July 2024

Appearances and goals by club, season and competition
Club	Season	League			National cup (Note: Includes Ukrainian Cup, U.S. Open Cup)		Continental		Other		Total	
Club	Season	Division	Apps	Goals	Apps	Goals	Apps	Goals	Apps	Goals	Apps	Goals
Metalurh-2 Zaporizhzhia	2006–07	Ukrainian Second League	4	0	0	0	–		–		4	0
Metalurh-2 Zaporizhzhia	2007–08	Ukrainian Second League	3	0	0	0	–		–		3	0
Metalurh-2 Zaporizhzhia	Total		7	0	0	0	0	0	0	0	7	0
Metalurh Zaporizhzhia	2007–08	Ukrainian Premier League	4	0	0	0	–		–		4	0
Metalurh Zaporizhzhia	2008–09	Ukrainian Premier League	17	0	0	0	–		–		17	0
Metalurh Zaporizhzhia	2009–10	Ukrainian Premier League	23	2	1	0	–		–		24	2
Metalurh Zaporizhzhia	Total		44	2	1	0	0	0	0	0	45	2
Shakhtar Donetsk	2010–11	Ukrainian Premier League	2	0	1	0	0	0	0	0	3	0
Shakhtar Donetsk	2011–12	Ukrainian Premier League	5	0	1	0	0	0	0	0	6	0
Shakhtar Donetsk	2012–13	Ukrainian Premier League	15	1	1	0	0	0	0	0	16	1
Shakhtar Donetsk	2013–14	Ukrainian Premier League	19	2	4	0	1 (Note: Appearance in UEFA Europa League)	0	0	0	24	2
Shakhtar Donetsk	2014–15	Ukrainian Premier League	17	3	2	0	2 (Note: Appearance(s) in UEFA Champions League)	0	0	0	21	3
Shakhtar Donetsk	2015–16	Ukrainian Premier League	7	0	4	0	3 (Note: One appearance in UEFA Champions League, two appearances in UEFA Europa League)	0	0	0	14	0
Shakhtar Donetsk	2016–17	Ukrainian Premier League	6	0	2	0	4 (Note: Two appearances in UEFA Champions League, two appearances and two goals in UEFA Europa League)	2	1 (Note: Appearance in Ukrainian Super Cup)	0	13	2
Shakhtar Donetsk	2017–18	Ukrainian Premier League	13	2	1	0	1	0	1	0	16	2
Shakhtar Donetsk	2018–19	Ukrainian Premier League	21	0	4	0	6 (Note: Five appearances in UEFA Champions League, one appearance in UEFA Europa League)	0	1	0	32	0
Shakhtar Donetsk	2019–20	Ukrainian Premier League	23	2	1	0	12 (Note: Six appearances in UEFA Champions League, six appearances in UEFA Europa League)	0	1	0	37	2
Shakhtar Donetsk	2020–21	Ukrainian Premier League	12	1	1	0	4 (Note: One appearance in UEFA Champions League, three appearances in UEFA Europa League)	0	1	0	18	1
Shakhtar Donetsk	2021–22	Ukrainian Premier League	7	0	1	0	4	0	1	0	13	0
Shakhtar Donetsk	Total		147	12	22	0	37	2	6	0	213	13
Inter Miami	2023	Major League Soccer	26	1	4	0	–		7 (Note: Appearances in Leagues Cup)	0	37	1
Inter Miami	2024	Major League Soccer	17	1	0	0	2 (Note: Appearances in CONCACAF Champions Cup)	0	0	0	19	1
Inter Miami	Total		43	2	4	0	2	0	7	0	56	2
Career total			241	16	26	0	39	2	13	0	321	18

=== International ===
As of match played 16 June 2023

Appearances and goals by national team and year
National team	Year	Apps	Goals
Ukraine	2011	1	0
Ukraine	2012	0	0
Ukraine	2013	0	0
Ukraine	2014	0	0
Ukraine	2015	0	0
Ukraine	2016	1	0
Ukraine	2017	2	0
Ukraine	2018	5	0
Ukraine	2019	7	0
Ukraine	2020	3	0
Ukraine	2021	11	0
Ukraine	2022	1	0
Ukraine	2023	1	0
Total		32	0

== Honours ==
Shakhtar Donetsk

- Ukrainian Premier League: 2010–11, 2011–12, 2012–13, 2013–14, 2016–17, 2017–18, 2018–19
- Ukrainian Cup: 2010–11, 2011–12, 2012–13, 2015–16, 2016–17, 2017–18, 2018–19
- Ukrainian Super Cup: 2010, 2012, 2013, 2014, 2015, 2017

Inter Miami

- Supporters' Shield: 2024
- Leagues Cup: 2023

Ukraine

- UEFA European Under-19 Championship: 2009
