= Franco Negri =

Argentine footballer (born 1995)

- Negri with Houston Dynamo FC in 2026

Personal information
- Date of birth: 20 February 1995 (age 31)
- Place of birth: San Martín, Argentina
- Height: 1.70 m (5 ft 7 in)
- Positions: Left-back; left midfielder

Team information
- Current team: Houston Dynamo
- Number: 21

Youth career
- San Martín
- 2012–2016: San Lorenzo

Senior career*
Years	Team	Apps	(Gls)
2016–2018	San Lorenzo	0	(0)
2016–2017	→ Quilmes (loan)	12	(0)
2017–2018	→ Indep. Rivadavia (loan)	18	(0)
2018–2020	Independiente Rivadavia	40	(5)
2020–2021	Belgrano	4	(0)
2021	Newell's Old Boys	23	(2)
2022	Godoy Cruz	30	(0)
2023–2024	Inter Miami	27	(1)
2024	Inter Miami II	6	(0)
2025	San Diego FC	15	(1)
2026–	Houston Dynamo	21	(1)
- * Club domestic league appearances and goals as of 2 November 2026

Franco Negri (born 20 February 1995) is an Argentine professional footballer who plays as a left-back or left midfielder for Major League Soccer club Houston Dynamo.

== Career ==
Negri joined Primera División side San Lorenzo from hometown club San Martín in 2012. On 22 August 2016, fellow Primera División team Quilmes completed the loan signing of Negri. His professional career debut arrived on 22 October as they beat Lanús 1–0 at the Estadio Centenario Ciudad de Quilmes. Twelve further appearances followed in all competitions during 2016–17, which ended in relegation for Quilmes. In September 2017, Negri left on loan again to play for Independiente Rivadavia of Primera B Nacional. He remained for the entirety of 2017–18 and featured in eighteen matches.

Independiente Rivadavia signed Negri permanently on 30 June 2018. He scored his first career goal on 2 September versus Central Córdoba. Further goals came against Gimnasia y Esgrima, Deportivo Morón, ex-club Quilmes and Platense across 2018–19 and 2019–20. In October 2020, fellow Primera Nacional team Belgrano completed the signing of Negri. He played four times for them in the shortened 2020 campaign, missing the other three games partly through suspension. On 24 February 2021, Negri joined Primera División outfit Newell's Old Boys on a free transfer.

On 10 February 2022, Negri joined Godoy Cruz.

On 11 January 2023, Negri signed a two-year deal with Major League Soccer side Inter Miami. Following his release from Miami at the end of their 2024 season, Negri joined San Diego FC on a one-year deal ahead of their debut season in MLS.

== Career statistics ==
As of 24 February 2021

Club statistics
Club	Season	League			National Cup		League Cup		Continental		Other		Total	
Club	Season	Division	Apps	Goals	Apps	Goals	Apps	Goals	Apps	Goals	Apps	Goals	Apps	Goals
San Lorenzo	2016–17	Primera División	0	0	0	0	—		0	0	0	0	0	0
San Lorenzo	2017–18	Primera División	0	0	0	0	—		0	0	0	0	0	0
San Lorenzo	Total		0	0	0	0	—		0	0	0	0	0	0
Quilmes (loan)	2016–17	Primera División	12	0	1	0	—		—		0	0	13	0
Independiente Rivadavia (loan)	2017–18	Primera Nacional	18	0	0	0	—		—		0	0	18	0
Independiente Rivadavia	2018–19	Primera Nacional	19	4	0	0	—		—		0	0	19	4
Independiente Rivadavia	2019–20	Primera Nacional	21	1	0	0	—		—		0	0	21	1
Independiente Rivadavia	Total		58	5	0	0	—		0	0	0	0	58	5
Belgrano	2020	Primera Nacional	4	0	0	0	—		—		0	0	4	0
Newell's Old Boys	2021	Primera División	0	0	0	0	—		—		0	0	0	0
Career total			74	5	1	0	—		0	0	0	0	75	5

== Honours ==
Inter Miami

- Supporters' Shield: 2024
- Leagues Cup: 2023
