= Nicolás Stefanelli =

Argentine footballer (born 1994)

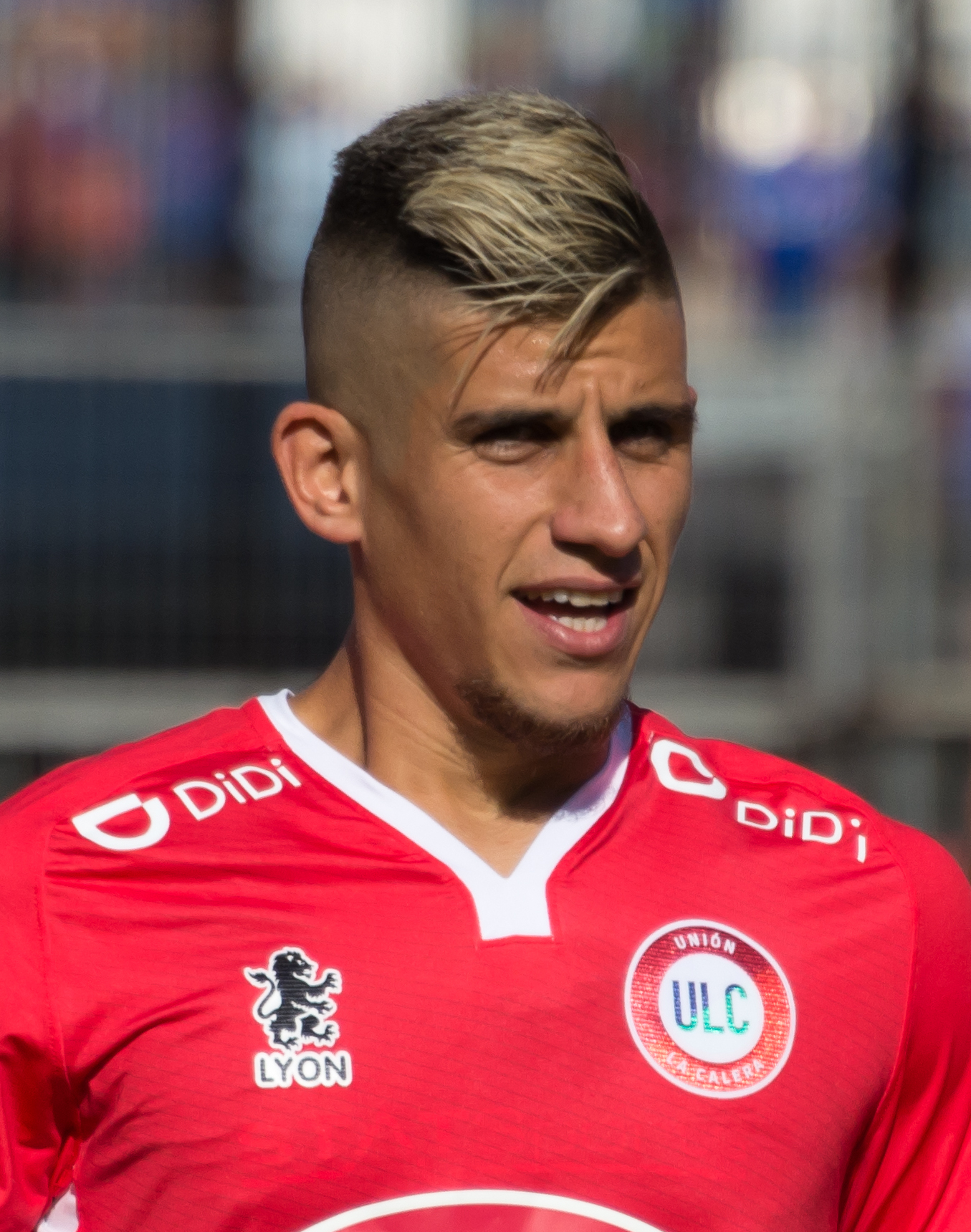
- Stefanelli with Unión La Calera in 2020

Personal information
- Full name: Nicolás Marcelo Stefanelli
- Date of birth: 22 November 1994 (age 31)
- Place of birth: Quilmes, Argentina
- Height: 1.66 m (5 ft 5 in)
- Positions: Attacking midfielder; striker

Team information
- Current team: Deportes La Serena

Senior career*
Years	Team	Apps	(Gls)
2014–2017	Defensa y Justicia	34	(11)
2014–2015	→ Villa Dálmine (loan)	27	(5)
2017–2020	AIK	34	(15)
2019	→ Anorthosis Famagusta (loan)	12	(2)
2019	→ Unión La Calera (loan)	10	(2)
2020–2021	Unión La Calera	30	(9)
2021–2022	AIK	58	(21)
2023	Inter Miami	25	(2)
2024–2025	Fehérvár	45	(6)
2025	Defensa y Justicia	5	(0)
2026–	Deportes La Serena	0	(0)
- * Club domestic league appearances and goals as of 17:30, 1 December 2025 (UTC)

Nicolás Marcelo Stefanelli (Spanish pronunciation: [nikoˈlas maɾˈθelo stefaˈneli]; born 22 November 1994) is an Argentine professional footballer who plays a striker for Chilean club Deportes La Serena.

== Club career ==
=== Defensa y Justicia ===
In 2014, Defensa y Justicia were promoted for the first time ever to the Argentine Primera División. During the following pre-season, in July 2014, Stefanelli was moved up to the A squad from the U19 squad. It was, however, decided that he would benefit from being loaned out, so he would have to wait another 18 months for his debut in the first tier.

=== Villa Dálmine ===
On 15 August 2014 Stefanelli started a loan spell at Villa Dálmine, contributing to their promotion from Primera B Metropolitana, the third tier of Argentine football, to Primera B Nacional, the second tier. His league debut came on 1 September 2014 in a 1–0 win over Club Atlético Atlanta. He came on as a substitute in the 75th minute, replacing Gabriel Sanabria. He scored his first goal for Dálmine three weeks later in a 1–1 draw with Chacarita Juniors. The goal came in the 75th minute, six minutes after he had been brought on off the bench.

=== Return to Defensa y Justicia ===
On 1 January 2016 Stefanelli returned to Defensa and the Argentine Primera Division. During 18 months he scored a total of 11 goals in 35 appearances. The club finished fourth in Zone 2 of the 2016 Argentine Primera División, which qualified them for the 2017 Copa Sudamericana. Defensa y Justicia finished tenth in the 2016–17 season and were therefore qualified for the 2018 Copa Sudamericana.

=== AIK ===
On 1 July 2017 AIK, of the Swedish first tier Allsvenskan, announced that they had signed Stefanelli on a three-and-a-half-year contract, from 15 July 2017 to 31 December 2020. He made his Allsvenskan debut on 16 July 2017, a 1–0 home win against IFK Norrköping. Stefanelli was praised by both pundits and AIK fans afterwards, even though he didn't manage to score. On 1 October 2017 he scored a hattrick when AIK won 5–2 win against Elfsborg.

He scored his only European goal against Shamrock Rovers in the 2018–19 UEFA Europa League

==== Loan to Anorthosis Famagusta ====
On 18 January 2019 it was announced that Stefanelli had signed a loan deal with Anorthosis Famagusta in the Cypriot First Division.

=== Return to AIK ===
On 26 February 2021 AIK confirmed that Stefanelli returned to the club.

=== Inter Miami ===
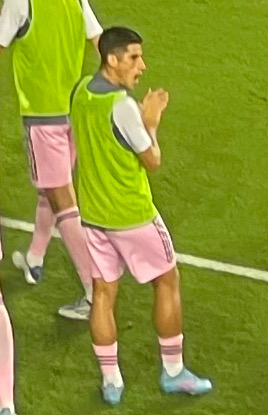
Stefanelli as a sub for Inter Miami in 2023

On 5 January 2023, Stefanelli joined Major League Soccer side Inter Miami on a two-year deal.

=== Fehérvár ===
On 31 January 2024, Stefanelli joined Hungarian club Fehérvár.

=== Deportes La Serena ===
In February 2026, Stefanelli returned to Chile after his stint with Unión La Calera and signed with Deportes La Serena.

== Personal life ==
Stefanelli is a dual national; he holds an Italian EU passport as well as an Argentine passport. He grew up and went to school in Quilmes, Argentina. Stefanelli is nicknamed "Chicho" in Argentina and "Nico" by his Swedish teammates.

== Career statistics ==
As of match played 4 December 2021

Appearances and goals by club, season and competition
Club	Season	League			Cup		Continental		Total	
Club	Season	Division	Apps	Goals	Apps	Goals	Apps	Goals	Apps	Goals
Villa Dálmine (loan)	2014	Primera B Metropolitana	13	4	0	0	—		13	4
Villa Dálmine (loan)	2015	Primera B Nacional	14	1	1	0	—		15	1
Villa Dálmine (loan)	Total		27	5	1	0	—		28	5
Defensa y Justicia	2016	Primera División	15	4	2	0	—		17	4
Defensa y Justicia	2016–17	Primera División	19	7	1	1	2	1	22	9
Defensa y Justicia	Total		34	11	3	1	2	1	39	13
AIK	2017	Allsvenskan	16	9	1	1	2	0	19	10
AIK	2018	Allsvenskan	18	6	4	0	3	1	25	7
AIK	Total		34	15	5	1	5	1	44	17
Anorthosis (loan)	2018–19	Cypriot First Division	12	2	0	0	—		12	2
Unión La Calera (loan)	2019	Chilean Primera División	10	2	2	0	—		12	2
Unión La Calera	2020	Chilean Primera División	30	9	—		6	0	36	9
Unión La Calera	Total		40	11	2	0	6	0	48	11
AIK	2021	Allsvenskan	29	12	1	0	—		30	12
AIK	2022	Allsvenskan	29	9	5	1	6	1	40	11
Total			58	21	6	1	6	1	70	23
Inter Miami	2023	Major League Soccer	25	2	5	2	—		30	4
Career total			230	67	22	5	19	3	271	75

== Honours ==
AIK

- Allsvenskan: 2018

Inter Miami

- Leagues Cup: 2023
