= David Ruiz (footballer, born 2004) =

American-Honduran footballer (born 2004)

- Ruiz with the New York Red Bulls in 2026

Personal information
- Full name: David Antonio Ruiz Ochoa
- Date of birth: 8 February 2004 (age 22)
- Place of birth: Miami, Florida, U.S.
- Height: 1.81 m (5 ft 11 in)
- Position: Midfielder

Team information
- Current team: New York Red Bulls (on loan from Inter Miami)
- Number: 8

Youth career
- 2014–2021: Miami United Stars
- 2021: Inter Miami

Senior career*
Years	Team	Apps	(Gls)
2021–2023	Inter Miami II (Note: Fort Lauderdale CF changed its name to Inter Miami CF II in 2022)	19	(0)
2023	→ Inter Miami (loan)	2	(0)
2023–	Inter Miami	61	(3)
2024	→ Inter Miami II (loan)	3	(0)
2026–	→ New York Red Bulls (loan)	4	(0)

International career^{‡}
2023	Honduras U20	2	(1)
2023–	Honduras U23	4	(1)
2023–	Honduras	11	(3)
- * Club domestic league appearances and goals as of 18:55, 15 November 2026 (UTC) ‡ National team caps and goals as of 18:55, 15 November 2026 (UTC)

David Antonio Ruiz Ochoa (born 8 February 2004) is a professional footballer who plays as a midfielder for Major League Soccer club New York Red Bulls, on loan from Inter Miami. Born in the United States, he represents the Honduras national team.

== Early life ==
Born in Miami, Ruiz later moved to Honduras at age five, before moving back to the United States three years later. Ruiz played youth soccer with the Miami United Stars for seven years. In 2021, he joined the Inter Miami CF academy.

== Club career ==
In 2021, Ruiz began playing with Fort Lauderdale CF (later renamed Inter Miami II) in USL League One, later in MLS Next Pro. In March 2023, Ruiz joined the Inter Miami first team roster on a short-term four-day loan. He made his MLS debut the next day, in a substitute appearance against the Chicago Fire. On 21 April, he signed a second short-term loan with the club, playing in their match against the Houston Dynamo. On 28 April, Ruiz signed a homegrown player contract with Inter Miami CF for him to join their Major League Soccer first team on a permanent basis through the 2025 season, with club options for 2026 and 2027. He scored his first professional goal on 13 May and recorded an assist against the New England Revolution, also being sent off in the match, after picking up a second yellow card in the 81st minute. He became the youngest player to record a goal and an assist for the club at 19 years and 95 days.

On 2 September 2026, New York Red Bulls acquired Ruiz on loan through the end of the 2026 season, with an option to buy attached.

== International career ==
Born in the United States to Honduran parents, Ruiz was eligible to represent the United States or Honduras.

In October 2022, he was called up at youth level with the Honduras U20 ahead of a series of friendly matches against US youth club teams. In January 2023, Ruiz was called up to a training camp with the United States U19. In April 2023, he was called up to the Honduras U20 for a training camp. He was then subsequently named to their squad for the 2023 FIFA U-20 World Cup. In their second match of the group stage, he scored his first goal in the first half on a penalty kick, before later being sent off after receiving a straight red card after slapping a South Korea U20 player.

In August 2023, Ruiz was called up to the Honduras senior national team for the upcoming September CONCACAF Nations League group matches. He made his senior debut on 12 September 2023, in a substitute appearance against Grenada.

== Career statistics ==
=== Club ===
As of match played 1 November 2026

Appearances and goals by club, season and competition
Club	Season	League			U.S. Open Cup		Continental		Other		Total	
Club	Season	Division	Apps	Goals	Apps	Goals	Apps	Goals	Apps	Goals	Apps	Goals
Inter Miami CF II	2021	USL League One	—		—		—		—		—	
Inter Miami CF II	2022	MLS Next Pro	16	0	—		—		—		16	0
Inter Miami CF II	2023	MLS Next Pro	3	0	—		—		—		3	0
Inter Miami CF II	2024	MLS Next Pro	2	0	—		—		—		2	0
Inter Miami CF II	Total		21	0	—		—		—		21	0
Inter Miami	2023	MLS	20	2	4	0	—		6 (Note: Appearances in Leagues Cup)	1	30	3
Inter Miami	2024	MLS	28	1	—		3 (Note: Appearances in CONCACAF Champions Cup)	0	3	0	34	1
Inter Miami	2025	MLS	4	0	—		3	0	0	0	7	0
Inter Miami	2026	MLS	9	0	—		0	0	2	0	11	0
Inter Miami	Total		61	3	4	0	6	0	11	1	82	4
New York Red Bulls (loan)	2026	MLS	4	0	—		—		—		4	0
Career total			86	3	4	0	6	0	11	1	107	4

=== International ===
As of match played 13 November 2026

Appearances and goals by national team and year
National team	Year	Apps	Goals
Honduras	2023	1	0
Honduras	2024	6	3
Honduras	2025	2	0
Honduras	2026	2	0
Total		11	3

== Honours ==
Inter Miami

- MLS Cup: 2025
- Supporters' Shield: 2024
- Leagues Cup: 2023
