= Diego Gómez (Paraguayan footballer) =

Paraguayan footballer (born 2003)

- Gómez with Paraguay in 2026

Personal information
- Full name: Diego Alexander Gómez Amarilla
- Date of birth: 27 March 2003 (age 23)
- Place of birth: San Juan Bautista, Paraguay
- Height: 1.83 m (6 ft 0 in)
- Position: Midfielder

Team information
- Current team: Brighton & Hove Albion
- Number: 25

Youth career
- Libertad

Senior career*
| Years | Team | Apps | (Gls) |
| 2022–2023 | Libertad | 40 | (5) |
| 2023–2024 | Inter Miami | 24 | (4) |
| 2025– | Brighton & Hove Albion | 58 | (8) |

International career^{‡}
| 2022–2023 | Paraguay U20 | 14 | (0) |
| 2023– | Paraguay U23 | 9 | (6) |
| 2022– | Paraguay | 32 | (3) |
Medal record
Men's football
Representing Paraguay
South American Games
| Gold medal – first place | 2022 Asunción | Team |
CONMEBOL Pre-Olympic Tournament
| Gold medal – first place | 2024 Venezuela | Team |
- * Club domestic league appearances and goals as of 8 November 2026 ‡ National team caps and goals as of 17 November 2026

Diego Alexander Gómez Amarilla (born 27 March 2003) is a Paraguayan professional footballer who plays as a midfielder for Premier League club Brighton & Hove Albion and the Paraguay national team. A versatile player, he can be deployed as a defensive midfielder, central midfielder, attacking midfielder or winger.

== Club career ==
=== Libertad ===
Gómez made his senior debut for Libertad on 4 May 2022 against Caracas FC in the Copa Libertadores. Shortly after he made his league debut for the club against Club Olimpia, where he was sent-off. Despite this, he became a regular in the centre of midfield for Libertad by June 2022. In August 2022 he scored his first senior league goals, scoring twice against Club 12 de Octubre SD. Gómez was awarded the best under-19 player award by Paraguayan news organisation Versus in 2022.

=== Inter Miami ===
On 20 July 2023, Gómez signed with Major League Soccer side Inter Miami for an undisclosed fee. On 21 February 2024, Gómez scored his first goal for the club in a 2–0 win over Real Salt Lake in the first game of the 2024 Major League Soccer season with the help of an assist from Luis Suárez.

=== Brighton and Hove Albion ===
On 10 December 2024, Gómez agreed to join Premier League club Brighton & Hove Albion on 1 January 2025 until 30 June 2030, in a deal believed to be worth about £14 million. He made his official debut on 19 January 2025 in a 3–1 win against Manchester United. On 25 May 2025, he netted his first Premier League goal in a 4–1 away win over Tottenham Hotspur on the final matchday of the 2024–25 season.

On 23 September 2025, Gómez scored four goals in Brighton's 6–0 away win against Barnsley in the third round of the EFL Cup. On 14 August 2026, he extended his contract with the club until 2031.

On 18 October 2026, Gómez scored a goal against Crystal Palace from 51 metres. This was the furthest range Premier League goal since Wayne Rooney scored from 58 metres in November 2017.

== International career ==
On 31 August 2022, at the age of 19, Gómez made his debut for the Paraguay senior team against Mexico. Later that year, he played as the Paraguay under-20 team secured victory at the 2022 South American Games held in Asunción, he was also part of the U20 team at the 2023 South American U-20 Championship in Colombia.

In February 2024, he captained Paraguay U-23 team, and finished as the competition's joint top goalscorer with five goals, at the 2024 CONMEBOL Pre-Olympic Tournament as his side won the tournament and a place at the 2024 Olympic Games. On 10 September, he scored his first senior international goal in a 1–0 victory over Brazil in Paraguay's CONMEBOL 2026 FIFA World Cup qualification campaign.

On 1 June 2026, he was named by head coach Gustavo Alfaro in Paraguay's 26-man squad for the 2026 FIFA World Cup.

== Career statistics ==
=== Club ===
As of match played 8 November 2026

Appearances and goals by club, season and competition
| Club | Season | League | | | National cup (Note: Includes U.S. Open Cup, FA Cup) | | League cup (Note: Includes EFL Cup) | | Continental | | Other | | Total | |
| Club | Season | Division | Apps | Goals | Apps | Goals | Apps | Goals | Apps | Goals | Apps | Goals | Apps | Goals |
|---|---|---|---|---|---|---|---|---|---|---|---|---|---|---|
| Libertad | 2022 | Paraguayan Primera División | 21 | 2 | 0 | 0 | — | | 5 (Note: Appearances in Copa Libertadores) | 0 | — | | 26 | 2 |
| Libertad | 2023 | Paraguayan Primera División | 19 | 3 | 0 | 0 | — | | 7 (Note: Six appearances and one goal in Copa Libertadores, one appearance in Copa Sudamericana) | 1 | — | | 26 | 4 |
| Libertad | Total | | 40 | 5 | 0 | 0 | — | | 12 | 1 | — | | 52 | 6 |
| Inter Miami | 2023 | Major League Soccer | 5 | 1 | 2 | 0 | — | | — | | 5 (Note: Appearances in Leagues Cup) | 0 | 12 | 1 |
| Inter Miami | 2024 | Major League Soccer | 19 | 3 | — | | — | | 4 (Note: Appearances in CONCACAF Champions Cup) | 1 | 5 (Note: Two appearances and two goals in Leagues Cup, three appearances in MLS Cup playoffs) | 2 | 28 | 6 |
| Inter Miami | Total | | 24 | 4 | 2 | 0 | — | | 4 | 1 | 10 | 2 | 40 | 7 |
| Brighton & Hove Albion | 2024–25 | Premier League | 16 | 1 | 3 | 0 | — | | — | | — | | 19 | 1 |
| Brighton & Hove Albion | 2025–26 | Premier League | 32 | 5 | 2 | 0 | 3 | 5 | — | | — | | 37 | 10 |
| Brighton & Hove Albion | 2026–27 | Premier League | 10 | 2 | 0 | 0 | 2 | 0 | 3 (Note: Appearances in UEFA Conference League) | 0 | — | | 15 | 2 |
| Brighton & Hove Albion | Total | | 58 | 8 | 5 | 0 | 5 | 5 | 3 | 0 | — | | 71 | 13 |
| Career total | | | 122 | 17 | 7 | 0 | 5 | 5 | 17 | 2 | 10 | 2 | 163 | 26 |

=== International ===
As of match played 17 November 2026

Appearances and goals by national team and year
| National team | Year | Apps | Goals |
|---|---|---|---|
| Paraguay | 2022 | 2 | 0 |
| Paraguay | 2023 | 5 | 0 |
| Paraguay | 2024 | 5 | 1 |
| Paraguay | 2025 | 9 | 1 |
| Paraguay | 2026 | 11 | 1 |
| Total | | 32 | 3 |

Scores and results list Paraguay's goal tally first, score column indicates score after each Gómez goal.

List of international goals scored by Diego Gómez
| No. | Date | Venue | Cap | Opponent | Score | Result | Competition |
|---|---|---|---|---|---|---|---|
| 1 | 10 September 2024 | Estadio Defensores del Chaco, Asunción, Paraguay | 9 | Brazil | 1–0 | 1–0 | 2026 FIFA World Cup qualification |
| 2 | 10 October 2025 | Suita City Football Stadium, Suita, Japan | 18 | Japan | 2–1 | 2–2 | 2025 Kirin Cup |
| 32 | 27 March 2026 | Karaiskakis Stadium, Piraeus, Greece | 22 | Greece | 1–0 | 1–0 | Friendly |

== Honours ==
Libertad

- Paraguayan Primera División: 2022 Apertura, 2023 Apertura

Inter Miami

- Supporters' Shield: 2024
- Leagues Cup: 2023

Paraguay U20

- South American Games: 2022

Paraguay U23

- CONMEBOL Pre-Olympic Tournament: 2024

Individual

- APF Paraguayan Primera Division Young Revelation Footballer of the Season: 2022
- CONMEBOL Pre-Olympic Tournament top scorer: 2024
- Major League Soccer Best Under-22 Player of the Season: 2024
- Paraguayan Footballer of the Year: 2024
- Olympic Athlete (by the Paraguayan Olympic Committee): 2024
- EFL Cup top scorer: 2025–26
- Brighton & Hove Albion Young Player of the Season: 2025–26
- Premier League Goal of the Month: October 2026
