= Kamal Miller =

Canadian soccer player (born 1997)

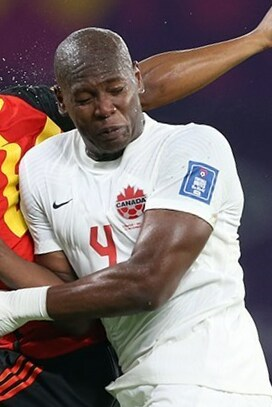
- Miller with Canada at the 2022 FIFA World Cup

Personal information
- Full name: Kamal Anthony Miller
- Date of birth: May 16, 1997 (age 29)
- Place of birth: Scarborough, Ontario, Canada
- Height: 6 ft 0 in (1.83 m)
- Position: Centre-back

Team information
- Current team: Portland Timbers
- Number: 4

Youth career
- Malvern SC
- North Scarborough SC
- Vaughan Azzurri

College career
Years	Team	Apps	(Gls)
2015–2018	Syracuse Orange	78	(7)

Senior career*
Years	Team	Apps	(Gls)
2014–2015	Vaughan Azzurri		
2016–2017	K-W United	23	(2)
2018	Reading United	9	(0)
2019–2020	Orlando City	28	(0)
2021–2023	CF Montréal	61	(3)
2023	Inter Miami	22	(0)
2024–	Portland Timbers	74	(2)

International career^{‡}
2017	Canada U20	1	(0)
2019–	Canada	52	(0)
2026	Canada B	1	(0)
Medal record
Representing Canada
Men's soccer
CONCACAF Nations League
Runner-up	2023
- * Club domestic league appearances and goals as of October 28, 2026 ‡ National team caps and goals as of March 31, 2026

Kamal Anthony Miller (born May 16, 1997) is a Canadian professional soccer player who plays as a centre-back for Major League Soccer club Portland Timbers and the Canada national team.

== Early life ==
Born in the Toronto suburb of Scarborough, Miller is of Jamaican and Trinadadian descent. He began playing youth soccer at age four with Malvern SC. Afterward, he played with North Scarborough SC and Vaughan Azzurri. Miller attended St. Mother Teresa Catholic Academy in Scarborough and also competed in Track and Field, making the OFSAA 2012 Championships.

== College career ==
Miller played four years of college soccer at Syracuse University between 2015 and 2018. He scored his first collegiate goal on September 22, 2015, against Binghamton. In 2018, he was named to the All-ACC third team and was named to the United Soccer Coaches All-South Region third team.

== Club career ==
=== Early career ===
While at college, Miller also played for League1 Ontario club Vaughan Azzurri and USL PDL sides K-W United FC and Reading United AC.

=== Orlando City ===
On January 11, 2019, Miller was selected 27th overall in the 2019 MLS SuperDraft by Orlando City. He officially signed with the club on March 1, 2019 and made his professional debut appearance the following day, starting in Orlando's season opener, a 2–2 draw with New York City FC. As part of Orlando's end-of-season roster decisions it was announced Miller had his contract option for the 2020 season exercised.

=== CF Montréal ===
Miller was selected by Austin FC in the 2020 MLS Expansion Draft and immediately traded to the Montreal Impact in exchange for $225,000 in General Allocation Money and a first round pick (11th) in the 2021 MLS SuperDraft. He made his debut for Montreal on April 17 against Toronto FC. After a strong start with Montreal, the club announced on July 12 a contract extension until 2023.

Miller scored his first goal for his new club on November 3, scoring the second in a 2–0 win over the Houston Dynamo. As a result of Miller's strong play for Montreal during the 2022 MLS season, in July 2022 the league announced him as one of the commissioner's picks for the 2022 MLS All-Star Game.

=== Inter Miami CF ===
On April 12, 2023, Miller was traded by CF Montréal to Inter Miami CF with $1.3 million in General Allocation Money for Bryce Duke and winger Ariel Lassiter. He made his Miami debut on April 22 against the Houston Dynamo. Miller later said that teammate Lionel Messi appreciated his willingness to defend him during matches and sometimes called him “security”.

In October 2023, Miami announced that they had signed Miller to a contract extension through the 2026 season, with a club option for 2027.

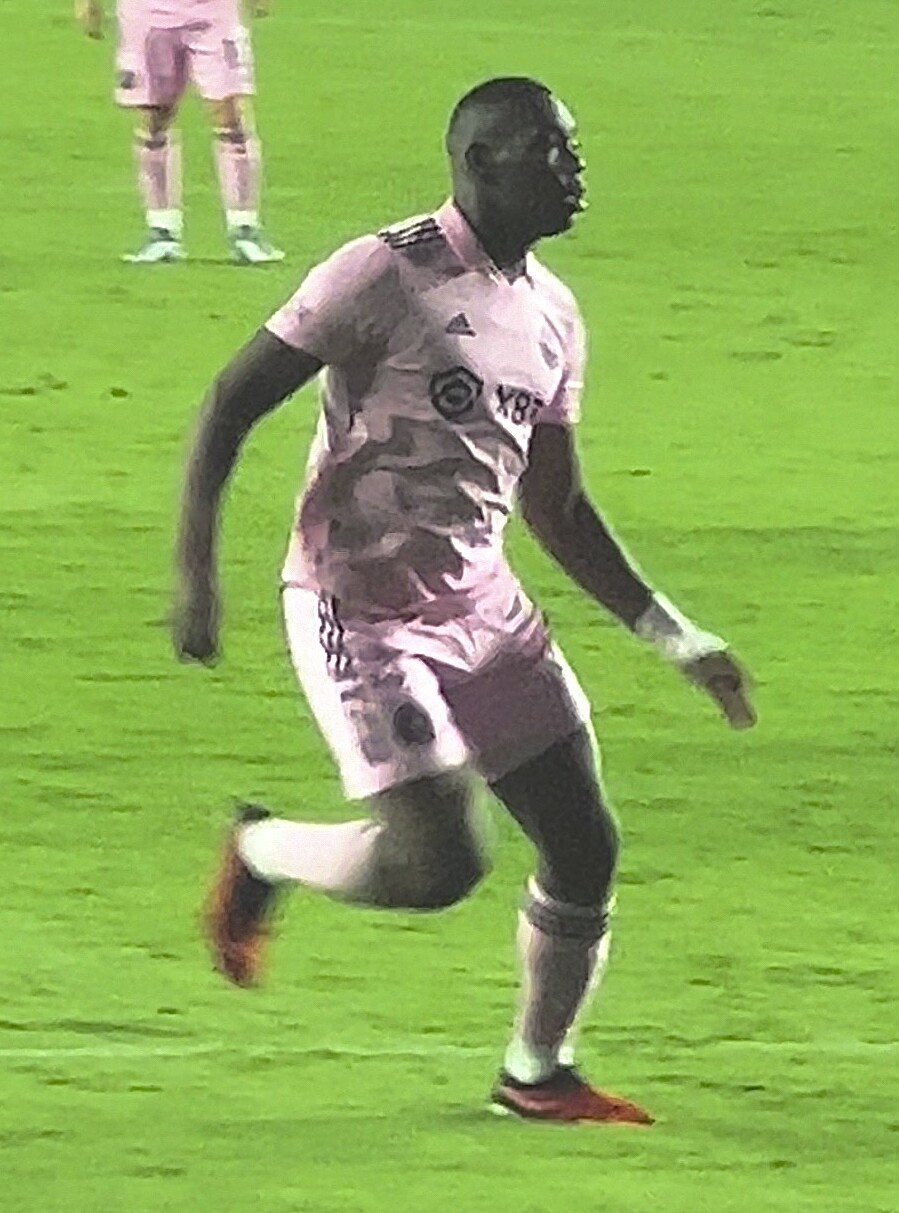
Miller with Inter Miami in 2023

=== Portland Timbers ===
Ahead of the 2024 season, he was traded to the Portland Timbers for $625,000 in general allocation money, an international roster spot, plus another $150,000 GAM in performance-based incentives.

On September 23, 2025, Miller converted a shot from about 30-yards to open the scoring in a 1–1 draw with the Vancouver Whitecaps. The goal was his first for Portland and it was voted the best goal of Matchday 36 and 37 with 45.5% of the fan vote.

== International career ==
=== Youth ===
Miller was capped at youth level for Canada U20s, competing at the 2017 CONCACAF U20 Championship. Miller was named to the Canadian U-23 provisional roster for the 2020 CONCACAF Men's Olympic Qualifying Championship on February 26, 2020.

=== Senior ===
On March 18, 2019, he received his first senior call-up for Canada for their final CONCACAF Nations League qualifying game against French Guiana.

In June 2019, Miller was selected in Canada's 2019 CONCACAF Gold Cup squad and made his senior international debut on June 23, entering as a 61st minute substitute in Canada's final group stage match, a 7–0 win over Cuba. In July 2021 Miller was called up to represent Canada at the 2021 CONCACAF Gold Cup. In November 2022, Miller was named to Canada's squad for the 2022 FIFA World Cup. He played every minute of the team's run in Qatar, as they were eliminated in the group stage. In June 2023 Miller was named to Canada's 23-man squad for the 2023 CONCACAF Nations League Finals. On June 19 he was called-up to the 2023 CONCACAF Gold Cup squad. In June 2024, Miller was named to Canada's roster for the 2024 Copa América.

== Career statistics ==
=== Club ===
As of match played October 28, 2026

Appearances and goals by club, season and competition
Club	Season	League			National cup		Playoffs		Continental		Other		Total	
Club	Season	Division	Apps	Goals	Apps	Goals	Apps	Goals	Apps	Goals	Apps	Goals	Apps	Goals
K-W United	2016	PDL	12	0	0	0	1	0	—		—		13	0
K-W United	2017	PDL	11	2	0	0	0	0	—		—		11	2
K-W United	Total		23	2	0	0	1	0	—		—		24	2
Reading United	2018	PDL	9	0	0	0	4	0	—		—		13	0
Orlando City	2019	MLS	16	0	—		—		—		—		16	0
Orlando City	2020	MLS	12	0	—		2	0	—		—		14	0
Orlando City	Total		28	0	0	0	2	0	—		—		30	0
CF Montréal	2021	MLS	27	1	1	0	—		—		—		28	1
CF Montréal	2022	MLS	27	2	0	0	2	0	4	0	—		33	2
CF Montréal	2023	MLS	6	0	0	0	—		—		—		6	0
CF Montréal	Total		60	3	1	0	2	0	4	0	—		67	3
Inter Miami	2023	MLS	22	0	6	0	—		—		7	0	35	0
Portland Timbers	2024	MLS	23	0	—		1	0	—		2	0	26	0
Portland Timbers	2025	MLS	24	1	1	0	4	1	—		3	0	32	2
Portland Timbers	2026	MLS	27	1	—		0	0	—		2	0	29	1
Portland Timbers	Total		74	2	1	0	5	1	—		7	0	87	3
Career total			216	7	8	0	14	1	4	0	14	0	256	8

=== International ===
As of match played March 31, 2026

Appearances and goals by national team and year
National team	Year	Apps	Goals
Canada	2019	3	0
Canada	2020	2	0
Canada	2021	13	0
Canada	2022	14	0
Canada	2023	9	0
Canada	2024	6	0
Canada	2025	3	0
Canada	2026	2	0
Total		52	0

== Honours ==
CF Montréal

- Canadian Championship: 2021

Inter Miami

- Leagues Cup: 2023

Individual

- MLS All-Star: 2022
