= Dixon Arroyo =

Ecuadorian footballer (born 1992)

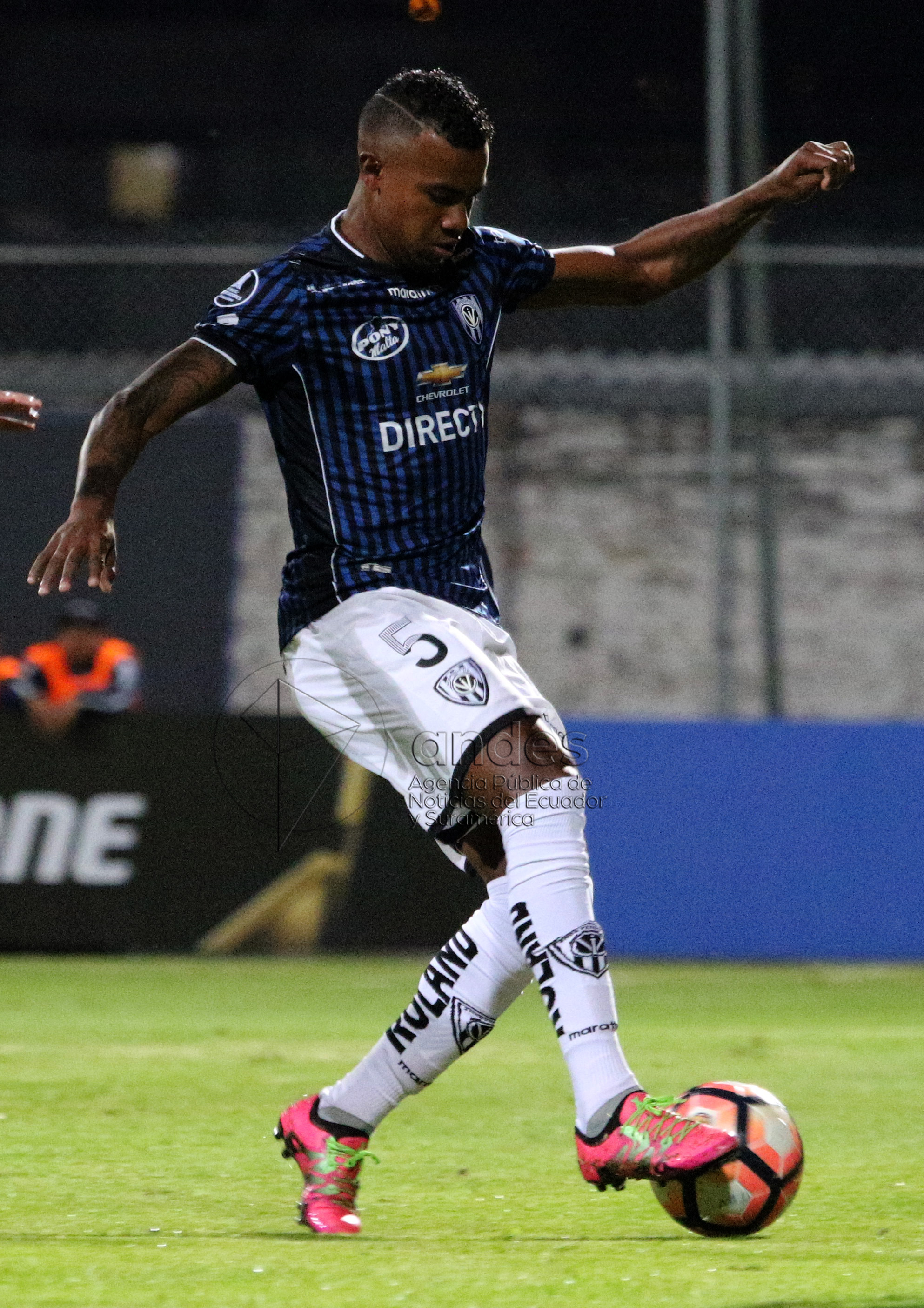
- Arroyo with Independiente del Valle in 2017

Personal information
- Full name: Dixon Jair Arroyo Espinoza
- Date of birth: 1 June 1992 (age 34)
- Place of birth: Guayaquil, Ecuador
- Height: 1.79 m (5 ft 10 in)
- Position: Midfielder

Team information
- Current team: Guayaquil City F.C.

Youth career
- –2008: Rocafuerte
- 2008–2009: Barcelona
- 2009: Norte América
- 2009: Chacarita
- 2009: → Deportivo Quito (loan)

Senior career*
Years	Team	Apps	(Gls)
2010	Chacarita	0	(0)
2010	→ Deportivo Quito (loan)	18	(0)
2011–2013	Deportivo Quito	21	(2)
2013–2015	LDU Loja	58	(3)
2015–2018	Independiente del Valle	104	(4)
2018–2023	Emelec	90	(3)
2023	Inter Miami	24	(1)
2024–2026	Barcelona S.C.	47	(0)

International career^{‡}
2011	Ecuador U20	4	(0)
2021–2022	Ecuador	2	(0)
- * Club domestic league appearances and goals as of 20 August 2025 ‡ National team caps and goals as of 22 June 2022

Dixon Jair Arroyo Espinoza (born 1 June 1992) is an Ecuadorian professional footballer who plays for Ecuadorian Serie A club Guayaquil City F.C..

== Club career ==
=== Inter Miami ===
Arroyo playing for Inter Miami in 2023

In April, 2023, Inter Miami announced that they have signed Dixon Arroyo for the rest of the 2023 season. The club said it "will help fill a need for us", since the main midfielder of the club, Gregore, was injured.

Barcelona S.C.

On January 17, 2024, Dixon Arroyo departed from Inter Miami to Barcelona S.C. on a free transfer.

== International career ==
He made his debut for Ecuador national football team on 29 March 2021 in a friendly against Bolivia.

Team	Year	Apps	Goals
Ecuador	2021	1	0
Ecuador	2022	1	0
Total		2	0

• National team caps and goals correct as of, 2 June 2024

== Honours ==
Deportivo Quito

- Serie A: 2011

Inter Miami

- Leagues Cup: 2023
