= Facundo Farías =

Argentine footballer (born 2002)

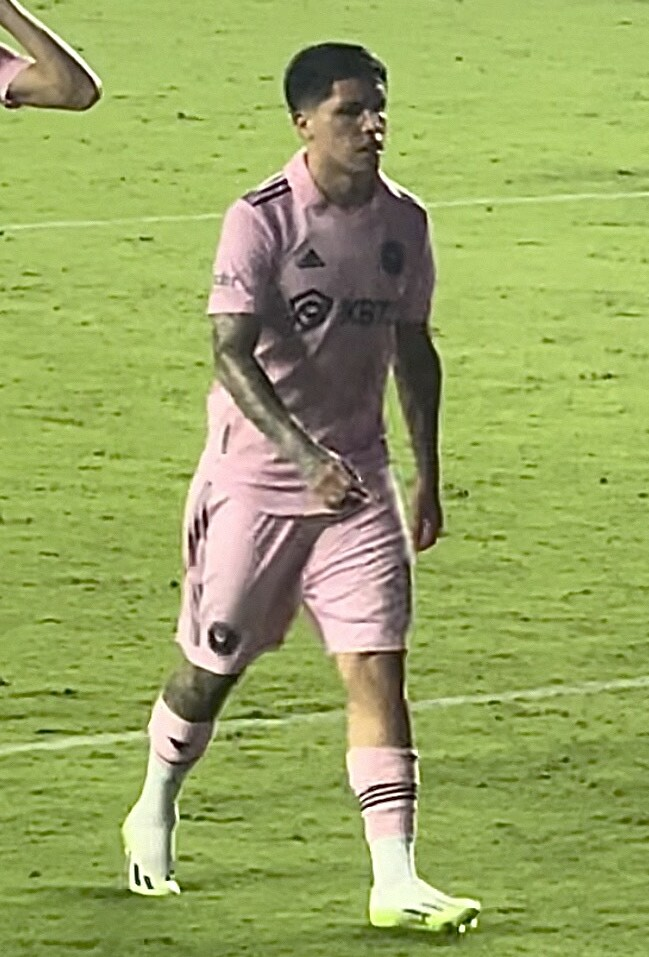
- Farías with Inter Miami in 2023

Personal information
- Full name: Facundo Hernán Farías
- Date of birth: 28 August 2002 (age 24)
- Place of birth: Santa Fe, Argentina
- Height: 1.75 m (5 ft 9 in)
- Position: Attacking midfielder

Team information
- Current team: San Lorenzo (on loan from Estudiantes)
- Number: 38

Youth career
- Escuela de Fútbol UNL
- Corinthians Santa Fe
- 2017–2019: Colón

Senior career*
Years	Team	Apps	(Gls)
2019–2023	Colón	81	(13)
2023–2025	Inter Miami	11	(3)
2025–	Estudiantes	35	(0)
2026–	→ San Lorenzo (loan)	9	(1)

International career
2023–	Argentina	0	(0)
- * Club domestic league appearances and goals as of 18:10, 21 November 2026 (UTC)

Facundo Hernán Farías (born 28 August 2002) is an Argentine professional footballer who plays as an attacking midfielder for San Lorenzo, on loan from Estudiantes.

== Club career ==
Farías started off with Escuela de Fútbol UNL, prior to having a stint in the academy of Corinthians Santa Fe. In 2015, Farías headed off to Colón's youth system.

November 2019 saw the midfielder moved into the club's first-team squad, ahead of a Primera División home fixture with Atlético Tucumán. Farías' professional debut subsequently arrived, as he featured for the final nineteen minutes of a defeat at the Estadio Brigadier General Estanislao López on 2 November after replacing Mauro Da Luz. Farías scored three goals in eight Copa de la Liga Profesional matches; versus Defensa y Justicia, Central Córdoba and Atlético Tucumán.

In July 2023, he was signed by Inter Miami, playing alongside fellow Argentine Lionel Messi. After suffering an anterior cruciate ligament injury in pre-season training, he was ruled out for the entire 2024 season.

On 31 January 2025, it was confirmed that he had returned to Argentina to sign for Estudiantes.

== International career ==
In 2015, Farías was called up to the Argentina U15s. Farías received call-ups to train with the Argentina U17s in 2019.

In October 2023, Farias received his first call up to the Argentina national team for the 2026 FIFA World Cup qualifiers against Paraguay and Peru. However, he was an unused substitute in both games.

== Career statistics ==
As of 6 January 2021

Appearances and goals by club, season and competition
Club	Season	League			National Cup		League Cup		Continental		Other		Total	
Club	Season	Division	Apps	Goals	Apps	Goals	Apps	Goals	Apps	Goals	Apps	Goals	Apps	Goals
Colón	2019–20	Primera División	2	0	0	0	0	0	—		0	0	2	0
Colón	2020–21 (Note: Soccerway counts Copa de la Liga Profesional appearances as league appearances.)	Primera División	8	3	0	0	0	0	—		0	0	8	3
Career total			10	3	0	0	0	0	—		0	0	10	3

== Honours ==
Colón

- Copa de la Liga Profesional: 2021

Inter Miami

- Leagues Cup: 2023
- Supporters' Shield: 2024

Estudiantes

- Primera División: 2025 Clausura
- Trofeo de Campeones de la Liga Profesional: 2025
