= Tomás Avilés =

Argentine footballer (born 2004)

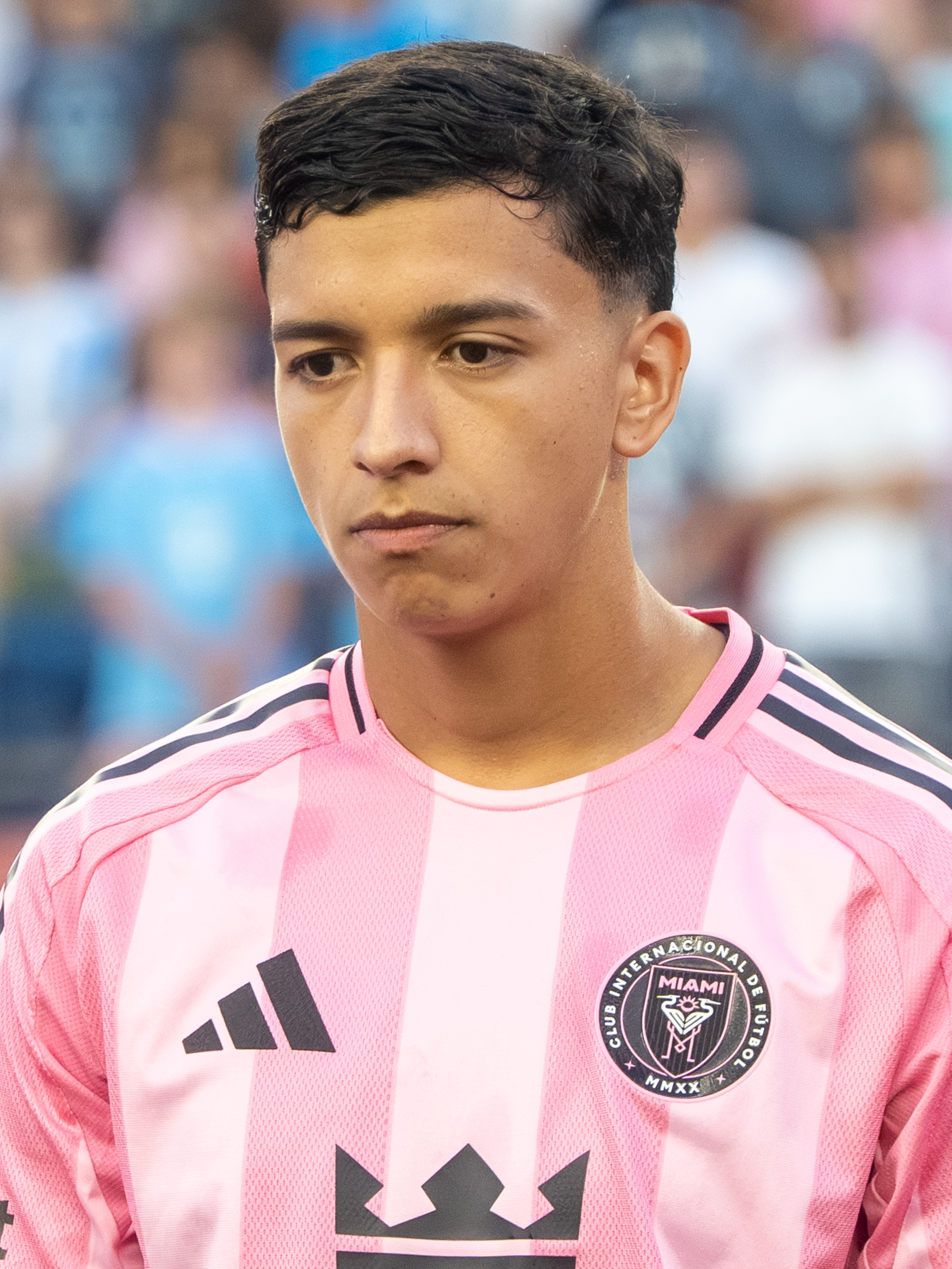
- Avilés with Inter Miami in 2025

Personal information
- Full name: Tomás Agustín Avilés
- Date of birth: 3 February 2004 (age 22)
- Place of birth: Río Gallegos, Argentina
- Height: 1.86 m (6 ft 1 in)
- Position: Centre-back

Team information
- Current team: O'Higgins (on loan from Inter Miami)

Youth career
- Boxing Club
- 2017–2019: CAI
- 2019–2020: Boxing Club
- 2020–2023: Racing Club

Senior career*
Years	Team	Apps	(Gls)
2023	Racing Club	15	(0)
2023–	Inter Miami	64	(3)
2026	→ CF Montréal (loan)	4	(0)
2026–	→ O'Higgins (loan)	0	(0)

International career^{‡}
2022–2023	Chile U20	6	(0)
2023	Argentina U20	2	(0)
- * Club domestic league appearances and goals as of 15 July 2026 ‡ National team caps and goals as of 17:09, 9 June 2023 (UTC)

Tomás Agustín "Toto" Avilés (born 3 February 2004) is an Argentine professional footballer who plays as a centre-back for Liga de Primera club O'Higgins on loan from Inter Miami. A former youth international for Chile, he plays for the Argentina U20s.

== Career ==
Avilés is a youth product of Boxing Club and CAI (Comodoro Rivadavia), before joining Racing Club's youth academy in January 2020. He spent his first year with them training alone due to the COVID-19 pandemic.

On 17 February 2023, he signed his first professional contract with Racing Club for 3 years. He made his senior and professional debut with Racing Club as a late substitute in a 2–1 Argentine Primera División win over Lanús on 27 February 2022.

On 1 August 2023, Avilés signed with Major League Soccer club Inter Miami on a deal until the end of 2026. On 26 August, he made his league debut in 2–0 win against New York City. In the season he made 11 appearances as Inter Miami would finish at the bottom-half of the table.

He would make his 2024 MLS debut on 21 February in a 2–0 win against Real Salt Lake but this time they finished the league with the most points in a Major League Soccer season, however they would leave the playoffs in the first round against Atlanta United.

On 22 February Avilés made his debut in the 2025 MLS season in a 2–2 draw against New York City, which he scored in the fifth minute and was sent off later.

Avilés was suspended for three games after throwing punches in Miami's 3–0 loss to the Seattle Sounders in the 2025 Leagues Cup.

In 2026, Avilés was sent on loan to CF Montréal. He switched to Chilean club O'Higgins for the second half of the year.

== International career ==
Avilés was born in Argentina, and is of Chilean descent through his maternal grandmother. He played for the Chile U20s at both the 2022 South American Games and the 2023 South American U-20 Championship. He was then called up to play for the Argentina U20s at the 2023 FIFA U-20 World Cup.

== Career statistics ==
=== Club ===
As of match played 30 September 2025

Club	Season	League			National cup (Note: Includes Copa Argentina, U.S. Open Cup, and Canadian Championship)		Continental		Other		Total	
Club	Season	Division	Apps	Goals	Apps	Goals	Apps	Goals	Apps	Goals	Apps	Goals
Racing Club	2023	Primera División	15	0	1	0	4	0	—		20	0
Racing Club	Total		15	0	1	0	4	0	—		20	0
Inter Miami CF	2023	Major League Soccer	11	1	1	0	—		—		12	1
Inter Miami CF	2024	Major League Soccer	30	0	—		4	1	3	0	37	1
Inter Miami CF	2025	Major League Soccer	22	2	—		4	0	7	0	33	1
Inter Miami CF	Total		63	3	1	0	8	0	10	0	82	3
CF Montréal (loan)	2026	Major League Soccer	0	0	0	0	—		0	0	0	0
Career total			78	3	2	0	12	0	10	0	102	3

== Honours ==
Inter Miami

- MLS Cup: 2025
- Supporters' Shield: 2024
- Leagues Cup: 2023
