= Leonardo Gil =

Argentine-Chilean footballer (born 1991)

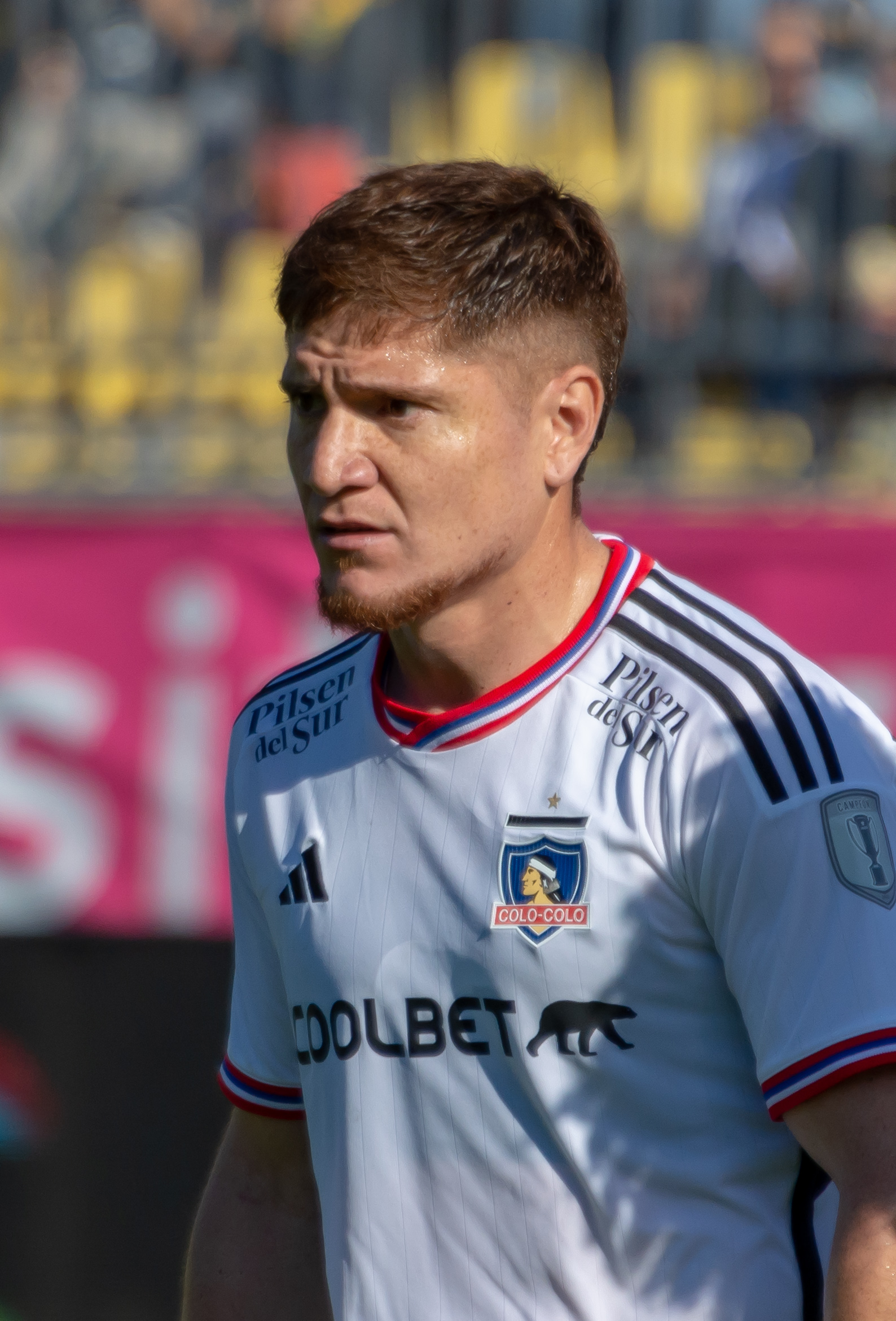
- Gil with Colo-Colo in 2023

Personal information
- Full name: Leonardo Roque Albano Gil Chiguay
- Date of birth: 31 May 1991 (age 35)
- Place of birth: Río Gallegos, Argentina
- Height: 1.76 m (5 ft 9 in)
- Position: Midfielder

Team information
- Current team: Huracán
- Number: 8

Youth career
- Ferrocarril YCF
- Boxing
- 2004–2009: C.A.I.

Senior career*
| Years | Team | Apps | (Gls) |
| 2009–2013 | C.A.I. | 60 | (1) |
| 2012–2013 | → Olimpo (loan) | 35 | (5) |
| 2013–2015 | Olimpo | 56 | (1) |
| 2015–2017 | Estudiantes | 30 | (0) |
| 2016–2017 | → Talleres (loan) | 29 | (2) |
| 2017–2020 | Rosario Central | 57 | (3) |
| 2020–2021 | Al-Ittihad | 13 | (1) |
| 2020–2021 | → Vasco da Gama (loan) | 19 | (0) |
| 2021 | → Colo-Colo (loan) | 29 | (8) |
| 2022–2025 | Colo-Colo | 72 | (6) |
| 2025– | Huracán | 51 | (2) |
- * Club domestic league appearances and goals as of 17:22, 6 July 2026 (UTC)

Leonardo Roque Albano Gil Chiguay (born 31 May 1991) is an Argentine-Chilean professional footballer who plays as a midfielder for Huracán.

== Club career ==
=== CAI ===
Born in Río Gallegos, Santa Cruz, Gil finished his formation with CAI, after representing Atlético Boxing Club and CSyD Ferrocarril YCF. He made his first team debut on 3 October 2009, coming on as a second-half substitute in a 1–0 Primera B Nacional home loss against Independiente Rivadavia.

Gil became a regular starter from the 2010–11 campaign onwards, as his side suffered two consecutive relegations.

=== Olimpo ===
In July 2012, Gil moved to Olimpo in the second division, initially on a one-year loan deal. He scored his first professional goal on 7 October, netting the only goal of the match in an away defeat of Boca Unidos.

An undisputed starter, he contributed with five goals in 35 matches as his side achieved promotion to Primera División. Bought outright during the pre-season, he made his top tier debut on 4 August 2013, starting in a 2–1 loss at San Lorenzo.

Gil scored his first goal in the main category of Argentine football on 9 May 2014, netting the opener in a 3–1 home win against Godoy Cruz.

=== Estudiantes and loan to Talleres ===
On 8 January 2015, Gil agreed to a three-year contract with fellow first division side Estudiantes, for a US$ 1 million fee for 50% of his federative rights. He made his debut for the club on 5 February, starting in a 1–0 Copa Libertadores away loss against Independiente del Valle.

Gil never established himself as a regular starter, and was loaned to fellow league team Talleres on 19 July 2016, for one year,

=== Rosario Central ===
On 29 July 2017, Gil agreed to a permanent four-year contract with Rosario Central. He made his debut for the club on 26 August by starting in a 1–1 away draw against Colón, and scored his first goal on 23 September by netting the opener in a 1–1 draw at Gimnasia La Plata.

=== Al-Ittihad ===
In January 2020, Gil completed a transfer to Saudi Arabia with Professional League side Al-Ittihad. He made his debut on 10 January during a 1–1 draw away to Al-Nassr, which preceded his first goal arriving on 31 January in a score draw away to Al-Raed. In ten months with the club, either side of the COVID-enforced break, Gil made fifteen appearances for Al-Ittihad; including two matches in the Arab Club Champions Cup.

==== Vasco da Gama loan ====
On 15 October 2020, Gil headed to Brazilian football after penning loan terms with Vasco da Gama of Série A; until June 2021. He was given his first appearance by manager Ricardo Sá Pinto on 21 October as Vasco lost at home to Corinthians, after he was substituted on in place of Andrey after fifty-three minutes.

==== Colo-Colo loan ====
On March 19, 2021, Gil was announced as a new player for the Chilean club Colo-Colo, not taking a foreigner's place up in the Chilean football as he was listed as a Chilean national.

=== Colo-Colo ===
For the 2022 season, Gil signed the definitive transfer to Colo-Colo and left Al-Ittihad.

=== Huracán ===
In 2025, Gil returned to his country of birth and signed with Huracán on a two-year deal.

== International career ==
Due to having a Chilean grandmother, Gil is eligible to represent Chile as well as Argentina. In 2015, Jorge Sampaoli wanted to nationalise Gil for Chile but he rejected in favour of pursuing chances with Argentina.

Gil was called up by Argentina's under-20s in May 2011, but never represented the side.

== Personal life ==
Due to his grandmother being Chilean, Gil is Chilean by descent, getting his official documentation on 24 April 2019.

== Career statistics ==
As of 22 March 2021.

| Club | Season | League | | | Cup | | League Cup | | Continental | | Other | | Total | |
| Club | Season | Division | Apps | Goals | Apps | Goals | Apps | Goals | Apps | Goals | Apps | Goals | Apps | Goals |
|---|---|---|---|---|---|---|---|---|---|---|---|---|---|---|
| CAI | 2009–10 | Primera B Nacional | 1 | 0 | 0 | 0 | — | | — | | — | | 1 | 0 |
| CAI | 2010–11 | Primera B Nacional | 33 | 0 | 0 | 0 | — | | — | | — | | 33 | 0 |
| CAI | 2011–12 | Torneo Argentino A | 26 | 1 | 0 | 0 | — | | — | | — | | 26 | 1 |
| CAI | Total | | 60 | 1 | 0 | 0 | — | | — | | — | | 60 | 1 |
| Olimpo | 2012–13 | Primera B Nacional | 35 | 5 | 4 | 1 | — | | — | | — | | 39 | 6 |
| Olimpo | 2013–14 | Primera División | 38 | 1 | 0 | 0 | — | | — | | — | | 38 | 1 |
| Olimpo | 2014–15 | Primera División | 18 | 0 | 1 | 0 | — | | — | | — | | 19 | 0 |
| Olimpo | Total | | 91 | 6 | 5 | 1 | — | | — | | — | | 96 | 7 |
| Estudiantes | 2015 | Primera División | 21 | 0 | 2 | 0 | — | | 9 (Note: Appearance(s) in the Copa Libertadores) | 0 | 2 (Note: Appearance(s) in Liguilla Pre Libertadores) | 0 | 34 | 0 |
| Estudiantes | 2016 | Primera División | 9 | 0 | 0 | 0 | — | | — | | 3 | 0 | 12 | 0 |
| Estudiantes | Total | | 30 | 0 | 2 | 0 | — | | 9 | 0 | 5 | 0 | 46 | 0 |
| Talleres (loan) | 2016–17 | Primera División | 29 | 2 | 1 | 0 | — | | — | | — | | 30 | 2 |
| Rosario Central | 2017–18 | Primera División | 22 | 0 | 2 | 0 | — | | 1 (Note: Appearance(s) in the Copa Sudamericana) | 0 | — | | 25 | 0 |
| Rosario Central | 2018–19 | Primera División | 19 | 2 | 5 | 0 | 1 | 0 | 4 | 0 | 1 (Note: Appearance(s) in the Supercopa Argentina) | 0 | 30 | 3 |
| Rosario Central | 2019–20 | Primera División | 16 | 1 | 0 | 0 | 0 | 0 | — | | — | | 16 | 1 |
| Rosario Central | Total | | 57 | 3 | 7 | 0 | 1 | 0 | 5 | 0 | 1 | 0 | 71 | 3 |
| Al-Ittihad | 2019–20 | Professional League | 13 | 1 | 0 | 0 | — | | — | | 2 (Note: Appearance(s) in the Arab Club Champions Cup) | 0 | 15 | 1 |
| Al-Ittihad | 2020–21 | Professional League | 0 | 0 | 0 | 0 | — | | — | | 0 | 0 | 0 | 0 |
| Al-Ittihad | Total | | 13 | 1 | 0 | 0 | 0 | 0 | 0 | 0 | 2 | 0 | 15 | 1 |
| Vasco da Gama (loan) | 2020 | Série A | 19 | 0 | 0 | 0 | — | | 4 | 0 | 0 | 0 | 23 | 0 |
| Colo-Colo (loan) | 2021 | Primera División | 0 | 0 | 0 | 0 | — | | — | | 1 (Note: Appearance(s) in the Supercopa de Chile) | 1 | 1 | 1 |
| Total | | | 299 | 13 | 15 | 1 | 1 | 0 | 18 | 0 | 8 | 0 | 342 | 15 |

== Honours ==
Rosario Central

- Copa Argentina: 2017–18
