= 2024 Inter Miami CF season =

Inter Miami CF
2024 season
- President: Jorge Mas
- Head coach: Gerardo Martino
- Stadium: Chase Stadium
- Major League Soccer: Conference: 1st Overall: 1st
- MLS Cup playoffs: Round one
- Leagues Cup: Round of 16
- CONCACAF Champions Cup: Quarterfinals
- Top goalscorer: League: Lionel Messi; Luis Suárez (20 each); All: Luis Suárez (25)
- Average home league attendance: 20,979
Home colors	Away colors	Third colors

The 2024 Inter Miami CF season was the fifth season in the history of Inter Miami CF and the 21st season of first-division club soccer in South Florida. The team were in their fifth year as a member of the Eastern Conference of Major League Soccer (MLS). In addition to playing in the MLS regular season, the club participated in the MLS Cup playoffs, in the CONCACAF Champions Cup for the first time, and in the Leagues Cup as defending champions.

The club embarked on an international tour during preseason from January to February that included friendly matches in El Salvador, Saudi Arabia, Hong Kong and Japan. Following over two years of AutoNation's DRV PNK branding, JPMorgan Chase bought the naming rights to the stadium, renaming it Chase Stadium.

Miami won the Supporters' Shield with the best regular season record in the league and 74 points, the most in MLS history. Lionel Messi, who scored 20 goals during the regular season, was awarded the Landon Donovan MVP Award for his 20 goals and 36 total goal contributions. The team were eliminated in the first round of the MLS Cup playoffs by Atlanta United FC, who were seeded ninth in the Eastern Conference; the 34-point difference between the two teams was the largest in playoffs history. The second and third matches in the best-of-three series were won by Atlanta.

== Management ==
Position	Staff
Ownership
Co-Owner	(England) David Beckham
Lead Managing Owner	(United States) Jorge Mas
Co-Owner	(United States) Jose Mas
Front office
Chief Business Officer	(Spain) Xavier Asensi
Sporting Director	(United States) Chris Henderson
Vice President	(United States) Pablo Alvarez
Coaching staff
Head Coach	(Argentina) Gerardo Martino
Assistant Coach	(Argentina) Javier Morales
Goalkeeper Coach	(Argentina) Sebastián Saja
Performance Director	(United States) Garrison Draper
Assistant Coach & Performance Analyst	(England) Alec Scott
Performance Analyst	(United States) Connor Ceballos

Last updated: November 16, 2023
Source: Inter Miami CF

== Squad ==
As of November 9, 2024

No.	Player	Nationality	Position	Date of birth (age)	Signed from
Goalkeepers
1	Drake Callender	(United States)	GK	October 7, 1997 (aged 27)	(United States) San Jose Earthquakes
13	CJ dos Santos	(United States)	GK	August 24, 2000 (aged 24)	(Portugal) Benfica
19	Oscar Ustari	(Argentina)	GK	July 3, 1986 (aged 38)	Free agent
99	Cole Jensen	(United States)	GK	January 22, 2001 (aged 23)	(United States) Xavier University
Defenders
6	Tomás Avilés	(Argentina)	DF	August 3, 2004 (aged 20)	(Argentina) Racing Club
14	David Martínez	(Paraguay)	DF	January 21, 1998 (aged 26)	(Argentina) River Plate
15	Ryan Sailor	(United States)	DF	November 27, 1998 (aged 25)	(United States) University of Washington
17	Ian Fray	(United States)	DF	August 31, 2002 (aged 22)	(United States) Fort Lauderdale CF
18	Jordi Alba	(Spain)	DF	March 21, 1989 (aged 35)	(Spain) Barcelona
21	Nicolás Freire	(Argentina)	DF	February 18, 1994 (aged 30)	(Mexico) UNAM
26	Tyler Hall	(United States)	DF	February 5, 2006 (aged 18)	(United States) Inter Miami CF II
27	Serhiy Kryvtsov	(Ukraine)	DF	March 15, 1991 (aged 33)	(Ukraine) Shakhtar Donetsk
32	Noah Allen	(United States)	DF	April 28, 2004 (aged 20)	(United States) Inter Miami CF II
33	Franco Negri	(Argentina)	DF	February 20, 1995 (aged 29)	(Argentina) Godoy Cruz
57	Marcelo Weigandt	(Argentina)	DF	January 11, 2000 (aged 24)	(Argentina) Boca Juniors
62	Israel Boatwright	(Dominican Republic)	DF	June 2, 2005 (aged 19)	(United States) Inter Miami CF II
Midfielders
5	Sergio Busquets	(Spain)	MF	July 16, 1988 (aged 36)	(Spain) Barcelona
7	Matías Rojas	(Paraguay)	MF	November 3, 1995 (aged 29)	(Brazil) Corinthians
11	Facundo Farías	(Argentina)	MF	August 28, 2002 (aged 22)	(Argentina) Colón
16	Robert Taylor	(Finland)	MF	October 21, 1994 (aged 30)	(Norway) Brann
20	Diego Gómez	(Paraguay)	MF	March 27, 2003 (aged 21)	(Paraguay) Libertad
24	Julian Gressel	(United States)	MF	December 16, 1993 (aged 30)	(United States) Columbus Crew
30	Benjamin Cremaschi	(United States)	MF	March 2, 2005 (aged 19)	(United States) Inter Miami CF II
35	Felipe Valencia	(United States)	MF	March 1, 2005 (aged 19)	(United States) Fort Lauderdale CF
41	David Ruiz	(Honduras)	MF	February 8, 2004 (aged 20)	(United States) Inter Miami CF II
42	Yannick Bright	(Italy)	MF	September 3, 2001 (aged 23)	(United States) University of New Hampshire
43	Lawson Sunderland	(United States)	MF	November 7, 2001 (aged 23)	(United States) Inter Miami CF II
55	Federico Redondo	(Argentina)	MF	January 18, 2003 (aged 21)	(Argentina) Argentinos Juniors
81	Santiago Morales	(United States)	MF	February 9, 2007 (aged 17)	(United States) Inter Miami CF II
Forwards
8	Leonardo Campana	(Ecuador)	FW	July 24, 2000 (aged 24)	(England) Wolverhampton Wanderers
9	Luis Suárez	(Uruguay)	FW	January 24, 1987 (aged 37)	(Brazil) Grêmio
10	Lionel Messi (captain)	(Argentina)	FW	June 24, 1987 (aged 37)	(France) Paris Saint-Germain
73	Leo Afonso	(Brazil)	FW	July 13, 2001 (aged 23)	(United States) University of Virginia

== Transfers ==
=== Transfers in ===
Date	Position	No.	Player	From	Type	Ref.
Winter 2023–24
December 22, 2023	FW	9	(Uruguay) Luis Suárez	(Brazil) Grêmio	Free	
January 1, 2024	FW	49	(Haiti) Shanyder Borgelin	(United States) New Mexico United	End of loan	
January 9, 2024	MF	24	(United States) Julian Gressel	(United States) Columbus Crew	Free	
January 10, 2024	DF	26	(United States) Tyler Hall	(United States) Inter Miami CF II	Homegrown Player	
January 10, 2024	DF	62	(Dominican Republic) Israel Boatwright	(United States) Inter Miami CF II	Homegrown Player	
January 23, 2024	DF	21	(Argentina) Nicolás Freire	(Mexico) UNAM	Loan	
February 23, 2024	MF	55	(Argentina) Federico Redondo	(Argentina) Argentinos Juniors	Undisclosed	
March 22, 2024	MF	42	(Italy) Yannick Bright	(United States) University of New Hampshire	SuperDraft	
March 28, 2024	DF	57	(Argentina) Marcelo Weigandt	(Argentina) Boca Juniors	Loan	
April 2, 2024	FW	73	(Brazil) Leo Afonso	(United States) University of Virginia	SuperDraft	
April 23, 2024	MF	7	(Paraguay) Matías Rojas	(Brazil) Corinthians	Free	
Summer 2024
July 25, 2024	DF	14	(Paraguay) David Martínez	(Argentina) River Plate	Loan	
September 9, 2024	GK	19	(Argentina) Oscar Ustari	Free agent	Free	

=== Transfers out ===
Date	Position	No.	Player	To	Type	Ref.
Winter 2023–24
October 25, 2023	MF	3	(Ecuador) Dixon Arroyo	(Ecuador) Barcelona SC	Option declined	
October 25, 2023	FW	12	(United States) Jake LaCava	(United States) Charleston Battery	Option declined	
October 25, 2023	FW	17	(Venezuela) Josef Martínez	(Canada) CF Montréal	Option declined	
October 25, 2023	MF	13	(Mexico) Víctor Ulloa	Retired	Out of contract	
January 4, 2024	DF	31	(Canada) Kamal Miller	(United States) Portland Timbers	$625,000 GAM	
January 6, 2024	DF	26	(Argentina) Leandro González Pírez	(Argentina) River Plate	$200,000	
January 31, 2024	FW	22	(Argentina) Nicolás Stefanelli	(Hungary) Fehérvár	Undisclosed	
February 1, 2024	DF	4	(Sweden) Christopher McVey	(United States) D.C. United	$100,000 GAM	
February 16, 2024	MF	25	(Colombia) Emerson Rodríguez	(Colombia) Millonarios	Loan	
February 19, 2024	MF	26	(Brazil) Gregore	(Brazil) Botafogo	Undisclosed	
February 19, 2024	MF	28	(Dominican Republic) Edison Azcona	(United States) Las Vegas Lights	Loan	
February 21, 2024	FW	14	(France) Corentin Jean	(United States) Inter Miami CF II	Buyout	
March 4, 2024	DF	2	(United States) DeAndre Yedlin	(United States) FC Cincinnati	$172,799 GAM	
March 5, 2024	MF	7	(Brazil) Jean Mota	(Brazil) Vitória	Undisclosed	
March 15, 2024	DF	40	(Republic of Ireland) Harvey Neville	(United States) Portland Timbers 2	Mutual agreement	
Summer 2024
June 30, 2024	FW	19	(United States) Robbie Robinson	Unattached	Contract terminated	
July 9, 2024	MF	28	(Dominican Republic) Edison Azcona	(United States) Las Vegas Lights	Undisclosed	
July 16, 2024	MF	25	(Colombia) Emerson Rodríguez	(Brazil) Vasco da Gama	Loan	
August 8, 2024	FW	49	(Haiti) Shanyder Borgelin	(Denmark) Vendsyssel	Undisclosed	

=== MLS SuperDraft ===
Round	Pick	Player	Pos.	Team
1	15	(Italy) Yannick Bright	MF	University of New Hampshire
1	24	(Northern Ireland) Ryan Carmichael	FW	Hofstra University
2	32	(Brazil) Leo Afonso	FW	University of Virginia
3	61	(Spain) Pep Casas	MF	UNC Wilmington

== Non-competitive ==
=== Pre-season ===
January 19 Friendly	El Salvador	0–0	Inter Miami CF	San Salvador, El Salvador
8:00 p.m. EST	Flores (yellow card) 48'; Cerén (yellow card) 63'	Report	Gregore (yellow card) 62'	Stadium: Estadio Cuscatlán; Attendance: 44,836; Referee: Iván Barton (El Salvador)

January 22 Friendly	FC Dallas	1–0	Inter Miami CF	Dallas, Texas
6:00 p.m. EST	Ferreira 3'	Report	Avilés (yellow card) 20'; Alba (yellow card) 35'; Gressel (yellow card) 39'	Stadium: Cotton Bowl; Attendance: 32,211; Referee: Ramy Touchan

January 29 2024 Riyadh Season Cup	Al Hilal	4–3	Inter Miami CF	Riyadh, Saudi Arabia
1:00 p.m. EST	Mitrović 10'; Al-Hamdan 13'; Michael 44'; Malcom 88'	Report	Suárez 34'; Messi 54' (pen.); Ruiz 55'	Stadium: Kingdom Arena; Attendance: 26,000; Referee: Edina Alves Batista (Brazil)

February 1 2024 Riyadh Season Cup	Al Nassr	6–0	Inter Miami CF	Riyadh, Saudi Arabia
1:00 p.m. EST	Otávio 3'; Talisca 10', 51' (pen.), 73'; Laporte 12'; Al-Amri (yellow card) 37'; Boushal (yellow card) 42'; Brozović (yellow card) 53'; Maran 68'	Report	Busquets (yellow card) 42'	Stadium: Kingdom Arena; Attendance: 25,000; Referee: Esther Staubli (Switzerland)

February 4 Friendly	Hong Kong League XI	1–4	Inter Miami CF	Hong Kong
3:00 a.m. EST	Anier 43'	Report	Taylor 40'; Sunderland 50'; Campana 56'; Sailor 85'	Stadium: Hong Kong Stadium; Attendance: 38,417; Referee: Tam Ping Wun (Hong Kong)

February 7 Friendly	Vissel Kobe	0–0 (4–3 p)	Inter Miami CF	Tokyo, Japan
5:00 a.m. EST		Report		Stadium: Japan National Stadium; Attendance: 28,614; Referee: Oh Hyeon-jeong (South Korea)
	Penalties
	Osako (penalty scored); Miyashiro (penalty scored); Yamaguchi (penalty missed); Yuruki (penalty scored); Hatsuse (penalty missed); Iino (penalty scored)		(penalty scored) Campana; (penalty scored) Gressel; (penalty scored) Alba; (penalty missed) Taylor; (penalty missed) Allen; (penalty missed) Gregore

February 15 Friendly	Inter Miami CF	1–1	Newell's Old Boys	Fort Lauderdale, Florida
7:30 p.m. EST	Ruiz (yellow card) 62'; Borgelin 64'	Report	Fernández (yellow card) 56'; F. Díaz 83'	Stadium: DRV PNK Stadium; Attendance: 17,550; Referee: Rubiel Vazquez (United States)

== Competitive ==
=== Overview ===
Competition	First match	Last match	Starting round	Final position	Record							
Competition	First match	Last match	Starting round	Final position	Pld	W	D	L	GF	GA	GD	Win %
Major League Soccer	February 21	October 19	Matchday 1	Winners	34	22	8	4	79	49	+30	64.71
MLS Cup playoffs	October 25	November 9	Round one	Round one	3	1	0	2	5	6	−1	33.33
CONCACAF Champions Cup	March 7	April 10	Round of 16	Quarterfinals	4	1	1	2	7	8	−1	25.00
Leagues Cup	July 27	August 13	Group stage	Round of 16	4	2	0	2	9	8	+1	50.00
Total					45	26	9	10	100	71	+29	57.78

Source: ESPN

=== Major League Soccer ===
==== League tables ====
MLS Eastern Conference table (2024)
Pos	Team	Pld	W	L	T	GF	GA	GD	Pts	Qualification
1	Inter Miami CF	34	22	4	8	79	49	+30	74	Qualification for round one, the 2025 Leagues Cup and the CONCACAF Champions Cup round one
2	Columbus Crew	34	19	6	9	72	40	+32	66	Qualification for round one and the 2025 Leagues Cup
3	FC Cincinnati	34	18	11	5	58	48	+10	59	Qualification for round one and the 2025 Leagues Cup
4	Orlando City SC	34	15	12	7	59	50	+9	52	Qualification for round one and the 2025 Leagues Cup
5	Charlotte FC	34	14	11	9	46	37	+9	51	Qualification for round one and the 2025 Leagues Cup

Source: MLS
Rules for classification: 1) points; 2) total wins; 3) total goal differential; 4) total goals scored; 5) fewer disciplinary points; 6) away goal differential; 7) away goals scored; 8) home goals differential; 9) home goals scored; 10) coin toss (2 clubs tied) or drawing of lots (≥3 clubs tied)

Overall MLS standings table
Pos	Team	Pld	W	L	T	GF	GA	GD	Pts	Qualification
1	Inter Miami CF (S)	34	22	4	8	79	49	+30	74	Qualification for the 2025 FIFA Club World Cup group stage and CONCACAF Champions Cup Round One (Note: As 2024 MLS Supporters' Shield champions)
2	Columbus Crew (L)	34	19	6	9	72	40	+32	66	Qualification for the CONCACAF Champions Cup Round of 16 (Note: As winners of Leagues Cup)
3	Los Angeles FC (U)	34	19	8	7	63	43	+20	64	Qualification for the CONCACAF Champions Cup Round One (Note: As runners-up of Leagues Cup)
4	LA Galaxy (C)	34	19	8	7	69	50	+19	64	Qualification for the CONCACAF Champions Cup Round of 16 (Note: As 2024 MLS Cup champions)
5	FC Cincinnati	34	18	11	5	58	48	+10	59	Qualification for the CONCACAF Champions Cup Round One (Note: As highest-ranked club in 2024 MLS Supporters' Shield not already qualified)

Source: MLS
Rules for classification: 1) points; 2) total wins; 3) total goal differential; 4) total goals scored; 5) fewer disciplinary points; 6) away goal differential; 7) away goals scored; 8) home goals differential; 9) home goals scored; 10) coin toss (2 clubs tied) or drawing of lots (≥3 clubs tied)
(C) MLS Cup champions; (L) Leagues Cup winners; (S) Supporters' Shield winners; (U) U.S. Open Cup winners

==== Results summary ====
Overall								Home						Away					
Pld	W	D	L	GF	GA	GD	Pts	W	D	L	GF	GA	GD	W	D	L	GF	GA	GD
34	22	8	4	79	49	+30	74	11	4	2	45	22	+23	11	4	2	34	27	+7

Source: MLS standings

==== Results by round ====
Round	1	2	3	4	5	6	7	8	9	10	11	12	13	14	15	16	17	18	19	20	21	22	23	24	25	26	27	28	29	30	31	32	33	34
Ground	H	A	H	H	A	A	H	H	A	H	A	H	A	A	H	A	H	H	A	H	A	A	A	H	H	H	A	H	A	A	H	A	A	H
Result	W	D	W	L	W	L	D	D	W	W	W	W	W	D	W	W	L	D	W	W	W	W	L	W	W	W	W	W	D	D	D	W	W	W
Position (East)	1	1	1	1	1	2	2	3	1	1	1	1	1	1	1	1	1	1	1	1	1	1	2	1	1	1	1	1	1	1	1	1	1	1

Source: MLS standings
A = Away; H = Home; W = Win; D = Draw; L = Loss; P = Postponed

==== Match results ====
February 21 1	Inter Miami CF	2–0	Real Salt Lake	Fort Lauderdale, FL
8:00 p.m. EST	Taylor 39'; Gómez (yellow card) 68', (goal) 83'	Report	Ruiz (yellow card) 15'	Stadium: Chase Stadium; Attendance: 21,137; Referee: Cristian Campo Hernandez

February 25 2	LA Galaxy	1–1	Inter Miami CF	Carson, CA
9:00 p.m. EST	Puig (penalty missed) 13'; Delgado (yellow card) 46' (yellow-red card) 88'; Joveljić 75'	Report	Gressel (yellow card) 11'; Busquets (yellow card) 21'; Alba (yellow card) 51'; Messi 90+2'	Stadium: Dignity Health Sports Park; Attendance: 27,642; Referee: Gabriele Ciampi

March 2 3	Inter Miami CF	5–0	Orlando City SC	Fort Lauderdale, FL
4:30 p.m. EST	Suárez 4', 11'; Taylor 29'; Gómez (yellow card) 51'; Messi 57', 62'; Campana (yellow card) 83'; Allen (yellow card) 86'	Report	Jansson (yellow card) 33'	Stadium: Chase Stadium; Attendance: 21,352; Referee: Jaime Herrera

March 10 4	Inter Miami CF	2–3	CF Montréal	Fort Lauderdale, FL
5:00 p.m. EDT	Redondo (yellow card) 18'; Avilés (yellow card) 49'; Kryvtsov (yellow card) 57'; Campana 71', (yellow card) 86'; Alba 80'; Allen (yellow card) 90+3'	Report	Álvarez 13'; Vilsaint (yellow card) 63'; Cóccaro 75'; Ibrahim 78'; Edwards (yellow card) 90+3'	Stadium: Chase Stadium; Attendance: 21,212; Referee: Aleksandar Zhelyazkov

March 16 5	D.C. United	1–3	Inter Miami CF	Washington, D.C.
2:00 PM EDT	Stroud 14'; McVey (yellow card) 21'; Pirani (yellow card) 27'; Herrera (yellow card) 34'; Peltola (yellow card) 68'; Klich (yellow card) 74'; Santos (red card) 82'	Report	Campana 24'; Avilés (yellow card) 28'; Busquets (yellow card) 55'; Suárez 72', 85'; Gómez (yellow card) 79'	Stadium: Audi Field; Attendance: 19,365; Referee: Lorenzo Hernandez

March 23 6	New York Red Bulls	4–0	Inter Miami CF	Harrison, NJ
2:00 p.m. EDT	Morgan 3', 51', 70'; Carmona 66'	Report	Kryvtsov (yellow card) 11'; Suárez (yellow card) 25'; Allen (yellow card) 84'	Stadium: Red Bull Arena; Attendance: 25,000; Referee: Rafael Santos

March 30 7	Inter Miami CF	1–1	New York City FC	Fort Lauderdale, FL
7:30 p.m. EDT	Suárez 15', (yellow card) 90'; Gressel (yellow card) 53'; Sailor (yellow card) 62'; Avilés (yellow card) 80'	Report	Tanasijević (yellow card) 33'; Martínez 34'; Jones (yellow card) 88'	Stadium: Chase Stadium; Attendance: 21,550; Referee: Filip Dujic

April 6 8	Inter Miami CF	2–2	Colorado Rapids	Fort Lauderdale, FL
7:30 p.m. EDT	Negri (yellow card) 38'; Messi 58'; Afonso 60'; Weigandt (yellow card) 90+4'; Alba (yellow card) 90+5'	Report	Navarro (yellow card) 19', (goal) 45' (pen.); Cabral (yellow card) 40'; Bassett 88'	Stadium: Chase Stadium; Attendance: 20,868; Referee: Ted Unkel

April 13 9	Sporting Kansas City	2–3	Inter Miami CF	Kansas City, MO
8:30 p.m. EDT	Thommy 6', 58'; Hernández (yellow card) 79'; Radoja (yellow card) 83'; Davis (yellow card) 89'	Report	Avilés (yellow card) 15'; Gómez 18', (yellow card) 56'; Messi 51'; Suárez 71'	Stadium: Arrowhead Stadium; Attendance: 72,610; Referee: Victor Rivas

April 20 10	Inter Miami CF	3–1	Nashville SC	Fort Lauderdale, FL
7:30 p.m. EDT	Messi 11', 81' (pen.); Ruiz (yellow card) 27'; Busquets 39'; Weigandt (yellow card) 40'	Report	Negri 2' (o.g.); MacNaughton (yellow card) 50'	Stadium: Chase Stadium; Attendance: 21,398; Referee: Ismail Elfath

April 27 11	New England Revolution	1–4	Inter Miami CF	Foxborough, MA
7:30 p.m. EDT	Chancalay 1'	Report	Messi 32', 67'; Cremaschi 83'; Suárez 88'	Stadium: Gillette Stadium; Attendance: 65,612; Referee: Rubiel Vazquez

May 4 12	Inter Miami CF	6–2	New York Red Bulls	Fort Lauderdale, FL
7:30 p.m. EDT	Rojas 48', 62'; Messi 50'; Avilés (yellow card) 57'; Suárez 69', 75', 81'	Report	Tolkin (yellow card) 25'; Vanzeir 30'; Duncan (yellow card) 38'; Carmona (yellow card) 39'; Forsberg 90+7' (pen.)	Stadium: Chase Stadium; Attendance: 21,488; Referee: Tori Penso

May 11 13	CF Montréal	2–3	Inter Miami CF	Montreal, QC
7:30 p.m. EDT	Duke 22'; Vilsaint 32'; Piette (yellow card) 43'	Report	Rojas 44'; Suárez 45+3'; Weigandt (yellow card) 55'; Cremaschi 59'; Busquets (yellow card) 68'	Stadium: Saputo Stadium; Attendance: 19,619; Referee: Drew Fischer

May 15 14	Orlando City SC	0–0	Inter Miami CF	Orlando, FL
7:30 p.m. EDT	Muriel (yellow card) 71'; Araújo (yellow card) 73'	Report	Cremaschi (yellow card) 57'; Taylor (yellow card) 65'	Stadium: Inter&Co Stadium; Attendance: 25,046; Referee: Rosendo Mendoza

May 18 15	Inter Miami CF	1–0	D.C. United	Fort Lauderdale, FL
7:30 p.m. EDT	Rojas (yellow card) 30'; Campana 90+4', (yellow card) 90+4'	Report	Birnbaum (yellow card) 20'; Benteke (yellow card) 26'; McVey (yellow card) 48'; Klich (yellow card) 90+6'	Stadium: Chase Stadium; Attendance: 21,318; Referee: Guido Gonzales, Jr.

May 25 16	Vancouver Whitecaps FC	1–2	Inter Miami CF	Vancouver, BC
10:30 p.m. EDT	Ahmed (yellow card) 34'; Gauld 72' (pen.); Schöpf (yellow card) 73'; Picault (yellow card) 90'	Report	Alba (yellow card) 20'; Taylor 38'; Bright (yellow card) 48'; Campana 54'; Weigandt (yellow card) 60'; Avilés (yellow card) 63'; Redondo (yellow card) 90'	Stadium: BC Place; Attendance: 51,035; Referee: Joe Dickerson

May 29 17	Inter Miami CF	1–3	Atlanta United FC	Fort Lauderdale, FL
7:30 p.m. EDT	Avilés (yellow card) 57'; Messi 62'	Report	Lobzhanidze 44', 59'; Thiaré 73'	Stadium: Chase Stadium; Attendance: 21,326; Referee: Armando Villarreal

June 1 18	Inter Miami CF	3–3	St. Louis City SC	Fort Lauderdale, FL
7:30 p.m. EDT	Messi 25'; Suárez 45+2'; Alba 85'; Busquets (yellow card) 90'	Report	Durkin 15'; Vassilev 41'; Parker (yellow card) 61'; Suárez 68' (o.g.)	Stadium: Chase Stadium; Attendance: 20,793; Referee: Allen Chapman

June 15 19	Philadelphia Union	1–2	Inter Miami CF	Chester, PA
7:30 p.m. EDT	Uhre 3'; Bedoya (yellow card) 34'; Wagner (yellow card) 64'; Flach (yellow card) 82'	Report	Ruiz (yellow card) 32' (yellow-red card) 69'; Gressel 47'; Avilés (yellow card) 66' (yellow-red card) 84'; Campana (yellow card) 75'; Alba (yellow card) 82'; Afonso 90+4'	Stadium: Subaru Park; Attendance: 19,513; Referee: Ismir Pekmic

June 19 20	Inter Miami CF	2–1	Columbus Crew	Fort Lauderdale, FL
7:30 p.m. EDT	Fray 10'; Allen (yellow card) 14'; Campana 21'; Alba (yellow card) 85'	Report	Hernández 40'	Stadium: Chase Stadium; Attendance: 19,939; Referee: Serhiy Boyko

June 29 21	Nashville SC	1–2	Inter Miami CF	Nashville, TN
8:30 p.m. EDT	Mukhtar 73', (yellow card) 83'	Report	Bright (yellow card) 31'; Fray 40'; Alba 44'	Stadium: Geodis Park; Attendance: 30,109; Referee: Lukasz Szpala

July 3 22	Charlotte FC	1–2	Inter Miami CF	Charlotte, NC
7:30 p.m. EDT	Agyemang 41', (yellow card) 45+2' (yellow-red card) 90+6'	Report	Kryvtsov (yellow card) 21'; Taylor 30'; Gómez (yellow card) 53'; Avilés (yellow card) 67'; Cremaschi 86'; Alba (yellow card) 90+3'	Stadium: Bank of America Stadium; Attendance: 47,218; Referee: Rubiel Vazquez

July 6 23	FC Cincinnati	6–1	Inter Miami CF	Cincinnati, OH
7:30 p.m. EDT	Kubo 10', 57'; Acosta 36'; Bucha 38'; Asad 45+4'; Nwobodo (yellow card) 55'; Valenzuela 72'; Santos (yellow card) 90'	Report	Kryvtsov 21', (yellow card) 61'; Weigandt (yellow card) 59'; Busquets (yellow card) 62' (yellow-red card) 62'	Stadium: TQL Stadium; Attendance: 25,513; Referee: Chris Penso

July 17 24	Inter Miami CF	3–1	Toronto FC	Fort Lauderdale, FL
7:30 p.m. EDT	Gómez 43'; Redondo 53', 59', (yellow card) 62'; Fray (yellow card) 87'	Report	Etienne (yellow card) 52', (goal) 80'	Stadium: Chase Stadium; Attendance: 20,120; Referee: Jair Marrufo

July 20 25	Inter Miami CF	2–1	Chicago Fire FC	Fort Lauderdale, FL
7:30 p.m. EDT	Rojas 6'; Taylor (yellow card) 39'; Alba 75'; Fray (yellow card) 85'	Report	Czichos 73'	Stadium: Chase Stadium; Attendance: 20,318; Referee: Marcos DeOliveira II

August 24 26	Inter Miami CF	2–0	FC Cincinnati	Fort Lauderdale, FL
7:30 p.m. EDT	Suárez 1', 6', (yellow card) 45+8'; Avilés (yellow card) 11' (yellow-red card) 42'; Alba (yellow card) 90+4'	Report	Yedlin (yellow card) 42'; Awaziem (yellow card) 45+4'; Acosta (yellow card) 65'; Robinson (yellow card) 78'	Stadium: Chase Stadium; Attendance: 20,106; Referee: Armando Villarreal

August 31 27	Chicago Fire FC	1–4	Inter Miami CF	Chicago, IL
8:30 p.m. EDT	Cuypers (yellow card) 29'; Czichos (yellow card) 64'; Koutsias 82'	Report	Salquist 25' (o.g.); Fray (yellow card) 45'; Suárez 46', 65', (yellow card) 76'; Redondo (yellow card) 58'; Martínez (yellow card) 79'; Cremaschi (yellow card) 83'; Taylor 90+3'	Stadium: Soldier Field; Attendance: 55,385; Referee: Pierre-Luc Lauzière

September 14 28	Inter Miami CF	3–1	Philadelphia Union	Fort Lauderdale, FL
7:30 p.m. EDT	Messi 26', 30', (yellow card) 87'; Avilés (yellow card) 32'; Suárez (yellow card) 75', (goal) 90+8'; Busquets (yellow card) 90+5'	Report	Uhre 2'; Elliott (yellow card) 56'; Sullivan (yellow card) 72'	Stadium: Chase Stadium; Attendance: 20,915; Referee: Serhiy Boyko

September 18 29	Atlanta United FC	2–2	Inter Miami CF	Atlanta, GA
7:30 p.m. EDT	McCarty (yellow card) 19'; Lobzhanidze 56'; Miranchuk 84'	Report	Weigandt (yellow card) 10'; Ruiz 29'; Campana 59', (yellow card) 78'	Stadium: Mercedes-Benz Stadium; Attendance: 67,795; Referee: Rosendo Mendoza

September 21 30	New York City FC	1–1	Inter Miami CF	New York, NY
2:00 p.m. EDT	Tanasijević (yellow card) 27'; Rodríguez (yellow card) 71'; Keaton (yellow card) 80'; Moralez (yellow card) 86'; Sands 90+5'	Report	Fray (yellow card) 35'; Alba (yellow card) 63'; Avilés (yellow card) 64'; Allen (yellow card) 65'; Suárez (yellow card) 68'; Campana 75'	Stadium: Yankee Stadium; Attendance: 44,738; Referee: Jon Freemon

September 28 31	Inter Miami CF	1–1	Charlotte FC	Fort Lauderdale, FL
7:30 p.m. EDT	Gómez (yellow card) 4'; Messi 67'; Weigandt (yellow card) 71'; Bright (yellow card) 73'; Avilés (yellow card) 82'	Report	Świderski 57'; Malanda (yellow card) 74'	Stadium: Chase Stadium; Attendance: 21,374; Referee: Ramy Touchan

October 2 32	Columbus Crew	2–3	Inter Miami CF	Columbus, OH
7:45 p.m. EDT	Rossi 46'; Camacho (yellow card) 59' (yellow-red card) 63'; Hernández 61' (pen.), (penalty missed) 84'	Report	Redondo (yellow card) 38'; Messi 45', 45+5'; Suárez 48'; Weigandt (yellow card) 49'; Bright (yellow card) 87'	Stadium: Lower.com Field; Attendance: 20,815; Referee: Drew Fischer

October 5 33	Toronto FC	0–1	Inter Miami CF	Toronto, ON
4:00 p.m. EDT	Longstaff (yellow card) 55'; Coello (yellow card) 77'; Rosted (yellow card) 79'	Report	Campana 90+3'	Stadium: BMO Field; Attendance: 30,217; Referee: Joe Dickerson

October 19 34	Inter Miami CF	6–2	New England Revolution	Fort Lauderdale, FL
6:00 p.m. EDT	Suárez 40', 43'; Cremaschi 58'; Messi 78', 81', 89'	Report	Langoni 2'; Borrero 34'	Stadium: Chase Stadium; Attendance: 21,429; Referee: Alexis Da Silva

=== MLS Cup playoffs ===
==== Round one ====
October 25 Match 1	Inter Miami CF	2–1	Atlanta United FC	Fort Lauderdale, FL
8:30 p.m. EDT	Suárez 2'; Alba 60'	Report	Lobzhanidze 39'; Williams (yellow card) 90+4'	Stadium: Chase Stadium; Attendance: 20,673; Referee: Allen Chapman

November 2 Match 2	Atlanta United FC	2–1	Inter Miami CF	Atlanta, GA
7:00 p.m. EDT	Hernández (yellow card) 45+1'; Williams 58', (yellow card) 64'; Slisz (yellow card) 90+3'; Silva 90+4', (yellow card) 90+5'	Report	Martínez 40'; Avilés (yellow card) 56'	Stadium: Mercedes-Benz Stadium; Attendance: 68,455; Referee: Rubiel Vazquez

November 9 Match 3	Inter Miami CF	2–3	Atlanta United FC	Fort Lauderdale, FL
8:00 p.m. EDT	Rojas 17'; Redondo (yellow card) 35'; Messi 65'; Busquets (yellow card) 80'	Report	Thiaré 19', 21'; Slisz 76'; Amador (yellow card) 88'	Stadium: Chase Stadium; Attendance: 20,813; Referee: Lukasz Szpala

=== U.S. Open Cup ===
Inter Miami CF was not sent to the tournament, and neither was their MLS Next Pro team Inter Miami CF II, following the deal reached on March 1, 2024, due to their participation in the 2024 CONCACAF Champions Cup.

=== CONCACAF Champions Cup ===
Inter Miami CF qualified for the tournament as the 2023 Leagues Cup winners.

==== Round of 16 ====
March 7 First leg	Nashville SC (United States)	2–2	(United States) Inter Miami CF	Nashville, TN
9:00 p.m. EST	Shaffelburg 4', 47'	Report	Messi 52'; Suárez 90+5'	Stadium: Geodis Park; Attendance: 30,109; Referee: Marco Ortíz (Mexico)

March 13 Second leg	Inter Miami CF (United States)	3–1 (5–3 agg.)	(United States) Nashville SC	Fort Lauderdale, FL
8:15 p.m. EDT	Suárez 8'; Messi 23'; Taylor 63'	Report	Surridge 90+3'	Stadium: Chase Stadium; Attendance: 18,143; Referee: Drew Fischer (Canada)

==== Quarterfinals ====
April 3 First leg	Inter Miami CF (United States)	1–2	(Mexico) Monterrey	Fort Lauderdale, FL
8:00 p.m. EDT	Avilés 19'; Ruiz (yellow card) 61' (yellow-red card) 65'	Report	Meza 69'; Rodríguez 89'	Stadium: Chase Stadium; Referee: Walter López (Guatemala)

April 10 Second leg	Monterrey (Mexico)	3–1 (5–2 agg.)	(United States) Inter Miami CF	Monterrey, Mexico
10:30 p.m. EDT	Vázquez 31'; Berterame 58'; Gallardo 64'	Report	Alba (yellow card) 75' (yellow-red card) 78'; Gómez 85'	Stadium: Estadio BBVA; Attendance: 53,032; Referee: Iván Barton (El Salvador)

=== Leagues Cup ===
==== Group stage (East 3) ====
Pos	Team	Pld	W	PW	PL	L	GF	GA	GD	Pts	Qualification	UAN	MIA	PUE
1	(Mexican Football Federation) UANL	2	2	0	0	0	4	2	+2	6	Advance to knockout stage	—	1–1	2–1
2	(United States Soccer Federation) Inter Miami CF	2	1	0	0	1	3	2	+1	3	Advance to knockout stage	—	—	—
3	(Mexican Football Federation) Puebla	2	0	0	0	2	1	4	−3	0		—	0–2	—

Source: Leagues Cup
Rules for classification: Tiebreakers

July 27 1	Puebla (Mexico)	0–2	(United States) Inter Miami CF	Fort Lauderdale, FL
8:00 p.m. EDT	Velasco (yellow card) 51'; Cavallini (yellow card) 89'	Report	Rojas 9'; Suárez (yellow card) 49', (goal) 72'; Weigandt (yellow card) 83'; Afonso (yellow card) 90+2'	Stadium: Chase Stadium; Attendance: 16,490; Referee: Selvin Brown

August 3 2	UANL (Mexico)	2–1	(United States) Inter Miami CF	Houston, TX
8:00 p.m. EDT	Brunetta 18'; Carioca (yellow card) 31'; Ibáñez (yellow card) 33'; Pizarro (yellow card) 72'; Vigón 84'	Report	Rojas (yellow card) 31'; Campana (yellow card) 38', (goal) 74' (pen.)	Stadium: NRG Stadium; Attendance: 46,080; Referee: Ismael Cornejo

==== Knockout stage ====
August 8 Round of 32	Inter Miami CF (United States)	4–3	(Canada) Toronto FC	Fort Lauderdale, FL
7:30 p.m. EDT	Rojas 3', 59'; Gómez 11'; Suárez 20'; Martínez (red card) 28'; Cremaschi (yellow card) 84'	Report	Insigne 15' (pen.), 41' (pen.); Laryea (yellow card) 43'; Wingo (yellow card) 54'; Allen 79' (o.g.)	Stadium: Chase Stadium; Attendance: 10,543; Referee: Adonai Escobedo

August 13 Round of 16	Columbus Crew (United States)	3–2	(United States) Inter Miami CF	Columbus, OH
7:30 p.m. EDT	Ramirez 67'; Rossi 69', 80'; Mățan (yellow card) 90'	Report	Rojas 10'; Weigandt (yellow card) 41'; Gómez 62'	Stadium: Lower.com Field; Attendance: 14,031; Referee: Iván Barton

== Statistics ==
As of end of 2024 season

=== Appearances and goals ===
A = Appearances, S = Starts, G = Goals

No.	Pos	Player	Nat	MLS			Playoffs			CCC			Leagues Cup			Total		
No.	Pos	Player	Nat	A	S	G	A	S	G	A	S	G	A	S	G	A	S	G
Goalkeepers
1	GK	Drake Callender	(United States)	32	32	0	3	3	0	4	4	0	3	3	0	42	42	0
13	GK	CJ dos Santos	(United States)	1	1	0	0	0	0	0	0	0	1	1	0	2	2	0
19	GK	Oscar Ustari	(Argentina)	1	1	0	0	0	0	–	–	–	–	–	–	1	1	0
Defenders
6	DF	Tomás Avilés	(Argentina)	27	26	0	3	3	0	4	4	1	3	3	0	37	36	1
14	DF	David Martínez	(Paraguay)	4	4	0	3	3	1	–	–	–	3	3	0	10	10	1
15	DF	Ryan Sailor	(United States)	9	2	0	0	0	0	1	0	0	0	0	0	10	2	0
17	DF	Ian Fray	(United States)	14	7	2	1	0	0	0	0	0	2	0	0	17	7	2
18	DF	Jordi Alba	(Spain)	28	24	4	3	3	1	3	3	0	4	4	0	38	34	5
21	DF	Nicolás Freire	(Argentina)	10	9	0	0	0	0	4	4	0	0	0	0	14	13	0
27	DF	Serhiy Kryvtsov	(Ukraine)	23	16	1	0	0	0	2	2	0	1	0	0	26	18	1
32	DF	Noah Allen	(United States)	18	8	0	2	1	0	3	2	0	3	1	0	26	12	0
33	DF	Franco Negri	(Argentina)	11	9	0	0	0	0	0	0	0	1	0	0	12	9	0
57	DF	Marcelo Weigandt	(Argentina)	23	22	0	3	3	0	2	2	0	4	4	0	32	31	0
~~2~~	DF	DeAndre Yedlin (Note: Player transferred out during the season)	(United States)	3	3	0	–	–	–	–	–	–	–	–	–	3	3	0
Midfielders
5	MF	Sergio Busquets	(Spain)	30	27	1	2	1	0	4	4	0	4	3	0	40	35	1
7	MF	Matías Rojas	(Paraguay)	14	9	4	2	1	1	–	–	–	4	4	4	20	14	9
11	MF	Facundo Farías	(Argentina)	0	0	0	0	0	0	0	0	0	0	0	0	0	0	0
16	MF	Robert Taylor	(Finland)	27	22	5	1	0	0	2	1	1	2	2	0	32	25	6
20	MF	Diego Gómez	(Paraguay)	19	15	3	3	3	0	4	4	1	2	2	2	28	24	6
24	MF	Julian Gressel	(United States)	32	31	1	0	0	0	4	4	0	4	3	0	40	38	1
30	MF	Benjamin Cremaschi	(United States)	22	12	4	3	1	0	0	0	0	2	0	0	27	13	4
41	MF	David Ruiz	(Honduras)	28	11	1	0	0	0	3	1	0	3	0	0	34	12	1
42	MF	Yannick Bright	(Italy)	23	14	0	2	2	0	0	0	0	4	3	0	29	19	0
43	MF	Lawson Sunderland	(United States)	5	3	0	0	0	0	1	0	0	0	0	0	6	3	0
55	MF	Federico Redondo	(Argentina)	16	14	2	3	3	0	2	2	0	4	4	0	25	23	2
82	MF	Pep Casas (Note: Player from Inter Miami II)	(Spain)	2	0	0	0	0	0	0	0	0	0	0	0	2	0	0
~~7~~	MF	Jean Mota	(Brazil)	2	0	0	–	–	–	–	–	–	–	–	–	2	0	0
Forwards
8	FW	Leonardo Campana	(Ecuador)	28	14	8	2	0	0	1	0	0	4	1	1	35	15	9
9	FW	Luis Suárez	(Uruguay)	27	21	20	3	3	1	4	4	2	3	3	2	37	31	25
10	FW	Lionel Messi	(Argentina)	19	15	20	3	3	1	3	3	2	0	0	0	25	21	23
73	FW	Leo Afonso	(Brazil)	11	1	2	0	0	0	1	0	0	2	0	0	14	1	2
~~49~~	FW	Shanyder Borgelin	(Haiti)	6	1	0	–	–	–	0	0	0	0	0	0	6	1	0
Total				34		78	3		5	4		7	4		9	45		99

=== Goalscorers ===
Rank	Pos.	No.	Player	MLS	PO	CCC	LC	Total
1	FW	9	(Uruguay) Luis Suárez	20	1	2	2	25
2	FW	10	(Argentina) Lionel Messi	20	1	2	0	23
3	FW	8	(Ecuador) Leonardo Campana	8	0	0	1	9
3	MF	7	(Paraguay) Matías Rojas	4	1	0	4	9
5	MF	20	(Paraguay) Diego Gómez	3	0	1	2	6
5	MF	16	(Finland) Robert Taylor	5	0	1	0	6
7	DF	18	(Spain) Jordi Alba	4	1	0	0	5
8	MF	30	(United States) Benjamin Cremaschi	4	0	0	0	4
9	FW	73	(Brazil) Leo Afonso	2	0	0	0	2
9	DF	17	(United States) Ian Fray	2	0	0	0	2
9	MF	55	(Argentina) Federico Redondo	2	0	0	0	2
12	DF	6	(Argentina) Tomás Avilés	0	0	1	0	1
12	MF	5	(Spain) Sergio Busquets	1	0	0	0	1
12	MF	24	(United States) Julian Gressel	1	0	0	0	1
12	DF	27	(Ukraine) Serhiy Kryvtsov	1	0	0	0	1
12	DF	14	(Argentina) David Martínez	0	1	0	0	1
12	MF	41	(Honduras) David Ruiz	1	0	0	0	1
Own goals				1	0	0	0	1
Total				79	5	7	9	100

=== Assists ===
Rank	Pos.	No.	Player	MLS	PO	CCC	LC	Total
1	DF	18	(Spain) Jordi Alba	10	0	0	5	15
2	FW	10	(Argentina) Lionel Messi	10	1	2	0	13
3	FW	9	(Uruguay) Luis Suárez	9	0	2	1	12
4	MF	24	(United States) Julian Gressel	9	0	1	0	10
5	MF	20	(Paraguay) Diego Gómez	3	1	1	1	6
6	MF	5	(Spain) Sergio Busquets	4	0	1	0	5
7	MF	16	(Finland) Robert Taylor	3	0	0	1	4
8	MF	55	(Argentina) Federico Redondo	2	1	0	0	3
8	DF	57	(Argentina) Marcelo Weigandt	2	1	0	0	3
10	MF	24	(Italy) Yannick Bright	2	0	0	0	2
10	FW	8	(Ecuador) Leonardo Campana	2	0	0	0	2
10	MF	7	(Paraguay) Matías Rojas	2	0	0	0	2
10	MF	41	(Honduras) David Ruiz	2	0	0	0	2
14	MF	30	(United States) Benjamin Cremaschi	1	0	0	0	1
14	DF	14	(Argentina) David Martínez	1	0	0	0	1
14	DF	33	(Argentina) Franco Negri	1	0	0	0	1
14	MF	43	(United States) Lawson Sunderland	1	0	0	0	1
Total				64	4	7	8	83

=== Clean sheets ===
Rank	No.	Player	MLS	PO	CCC	LC	Total
1	1	(United States) Drake Callender	5	0	0	0	5
2	13	(United States) CJ dos Santos	0	0	0	1	1
2	19	(Argentina) Oscar Ustari	1	0	0	0	1
Total			6	0	0	1	7

=== Awards ===
Pos.	No.	Player	Award
FW	10	(Argentina) Lionel Messi	Landon Donovan MVP Award
