= Marcelo Weigandt =

Argentine footballer (born 2000)

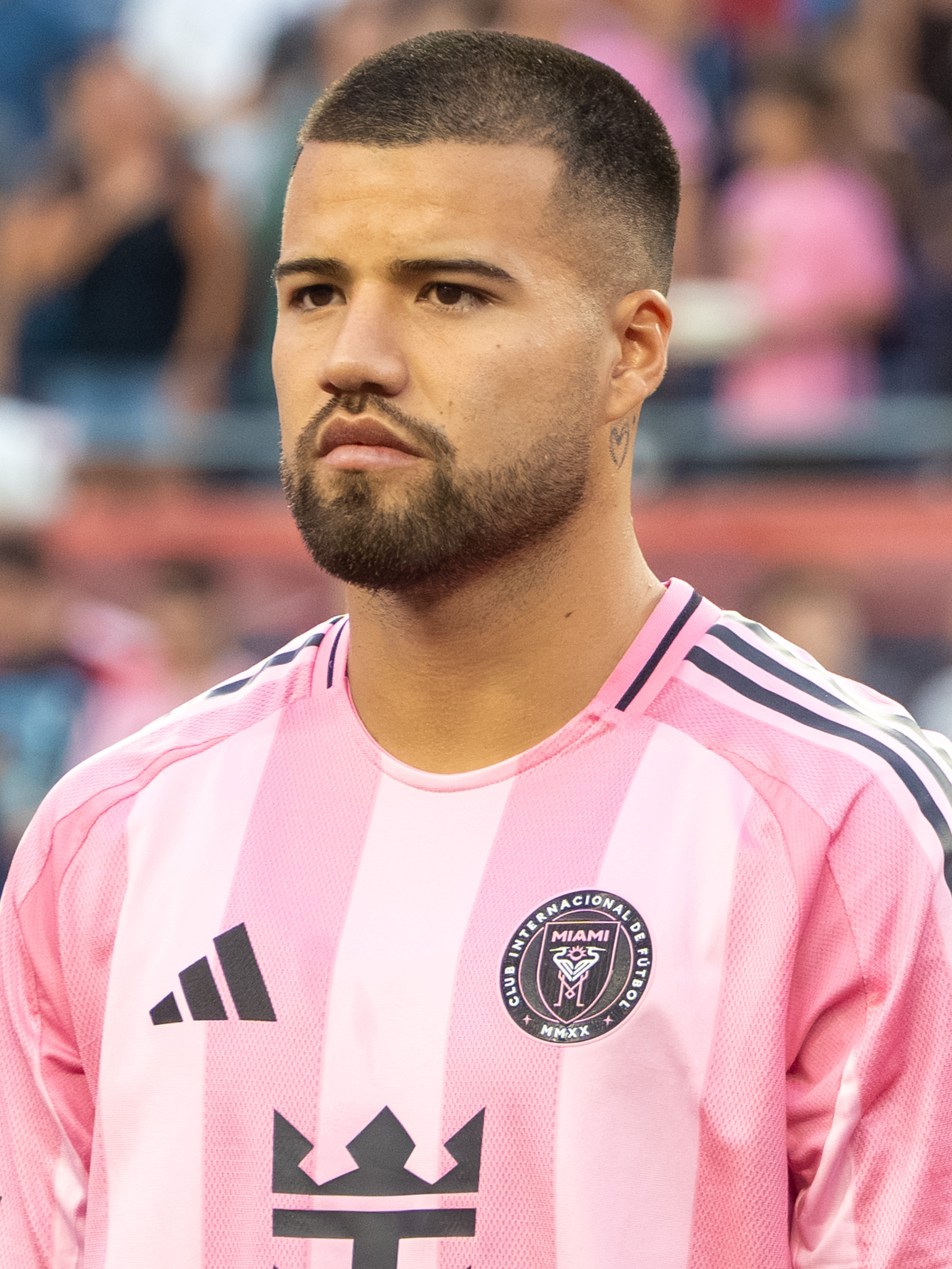
- Weigandt with Inter Miami in 2025

Personal information
- Full name: Marcelo Alexis Weigandt
- Date of birth: 11 January 2000 (age 26)
- Place of birth: Avellaneda, Argentina
- Height: 1.75 m (5 ft 9 in)
- Position: Right-back

Team information
- Current team: Liga de Quito
- Number: 57

Youth career
- Club Villa Ideal
- 2007–2018: Boca Juniors

Senior career*
Years	Team	Apps	(Gls)
2018–	Boca Juniors	47	(1)
2020–2021	→ Gimnasia y Esgrima LP (loan)	0	(0)
2024–2025	→ Inter Miami (loan)	47	(1)
2026–	→ Liga de Quito (loan)	4	(0)

International career^{‡}
2015	Argentina U15		
2017	Argentina U17	2	(0)
2019	Argentina U20	2	(0)
Medal record
Men's football
Representing Argentina
South American U-15 Championship
Third place	2015 Colombia
- * Club domestic league appearances and goals as of 18:11, 3 October 2026 (UTC) ‡ National team caps and goals as of 7 October 2020 (UTC)

Marcelo Alexis "Chelo" Weigandt (born 11 January 2000) is an Argentine professional footballer who plays as a right-back for Ecuador's LigaPro Serie A club Liga de Quito.

== Club career ==
Weigandt came through the youth ranks of Boca Juniors, having joined in 2007 from Club Villa Ideal. His breakthrough came during the 2018–19 Primera División campaign, as he was an unused substitute for league fixtures with Gimnasia y Esgrima and Newell's Old Boys. Gustavo Alfaro selected the defender for his senior debut in the Copa Argentina on 19 April 2019 versus Torneo Federal A's Estudiantes, he played the full duration of a 2–0 victory. He appeared again later that month in the Copa de la Superliga versus Godoy Cruz, as they won the round of sixteen first leg away from home.

After ten further appearances for Boca, including five in the Copa Libertadores, Weigandt was loaned out in 2020–21 to fellow Primera División side Gimnasia y Esgrima.

In March 2024, Weigandt joined Major League Soccer club Inter Miami on loan for the duration of the 2024 season with an option to extend for another season if he played at least ten games for the team.

== International career ==
Weigandt represented Argentina at the 2017 South American U-17 Championship in Chile, featuring against Venezuela and Paraguay as they were eliminated at the first group stage. He previously appeared at the 2015 South American U-15 Championship in Colombia, winning the bronze medal. Weigandt received a call-up from the U20s in March 2019. He subsequently received a place in Fernando Batista's squad for the 2019 FIFA U-20 World Cup in Poland. He appeared in matches with Portugal and South Korea as Argentina were eliminated at the round of sixteen.

== Career statistics ==
As of match played 24 February 2026.

Appearances and goals by club, season and competition
Club	Season	League			National cup (Note: Includes Copa Argentina)		League cup (Note: Includes Copa de la Liga Profesional, Copa de la Superliga, and MLS Cup playoffs)		Continental (Note: Includes Copa Libertadores and CONCACAF Champions Cup)		Other		Total	
Club	Season	Division	Apps	Goals	Apps	Goals	Apps	Goals	Apps	Goals	Apps	Goals	Apps	Goals
Boca Juniors	2018–19	Primera División	—		2	0	2	0	—		—		4	0
Boca Juniors	2019–20	Primera División	3	0	—		—		5	0	—		8	0
Boca Juniors	2021	Primera División	10	1	1	0	—		2	0	—		13	1
Boca Juniors	2022	Primera División	8	0	4	0	3	0	—		—		15	0
Boca Juniors	2023	Primera División	15	0	2	0	7	0	8	2	—		32	2
Boca Juniors	2025	Primera División	3	0	0	0	0	0	0	0			3	0
Boca Juniors	Total		39	1	9	0	12	0	15	2	—		75	3
Gimnasia y Esgrima (loan)	2020–21	Primera División	—		1	0	8	1	—		—		9	1
Gimnasia y Esgrima (loan)	2021	Primera División	—		—		12	2	—		—		12	2
Gimnasia y Esgrima (loan)	Total		0	0	1	0	20	3	0	0	—		21	3
Inter Miami (loan)	2024	Major League Soccer	23	0	—		3	0	2	0	4 (Note: Appearances in Leagues Cup)	0	32	0
Inter Miami (loan)	2025	Major League Soccer	24	1	—		3	0	4	0	4 (Note: Appearances in Leagues Cup)	1	35	2
Inter Miami (loan)	Total		47	1	—		6	0	6	0	8	1	67	2
Career total			83	2	10	0	38	3	21	2	8	1	114	6

== Honours ==
Boca Juniors

- Primera División: 2019–20, 2022
- Copa Argentina: 2019–20
- Copa de la Liga Profesional: 2022
- Supercopa Argentina: 2018, 2022

Inter Miami

- MLS Cup: 2025
- Supporters' Shield: 2024
