= Kevin Medina =

Kevin Medina may refer to:

- Kevin Medina (Colombian footballer) (born 1993), Colombian football defender
- Kevin Medina (Spanish footballer) (born 2001), Spanish football winger

== See also ==
- Kelvin Medina (born 1994), Cape Verdean football midfielder
