= Atlético Boxing Club =

Boxing Club
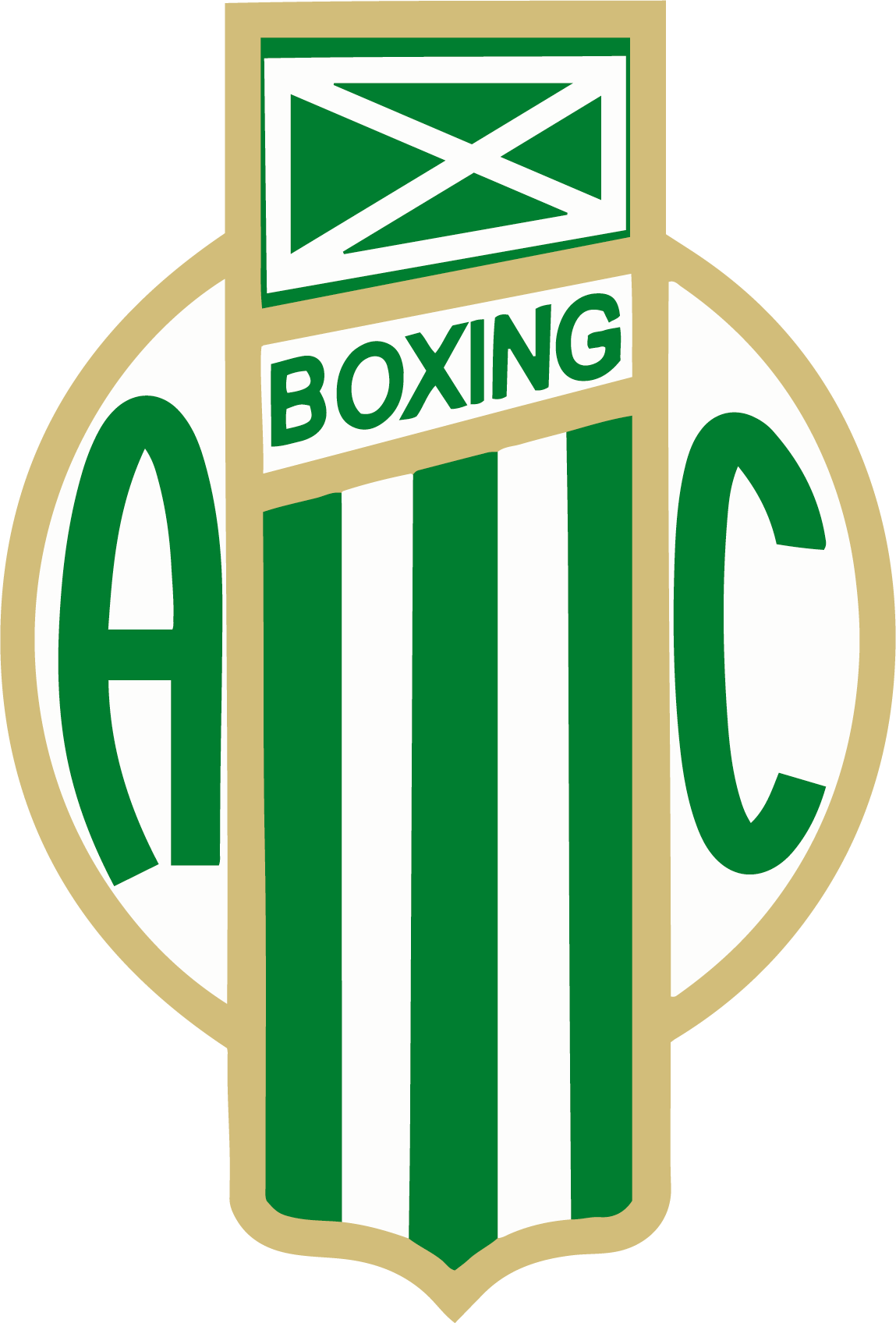
- Full name: Atlético Boxing Club
- Nickname: Los Albiverdes
- Founded: 23 August 1920; 106 years ago
- Ground: Estadio Ciudad del Centenario; Río Gallegos, Santa Cruz
- Capacity: 1,500
- Chairman: (Argentina) Leonardo Matta
- Manager: (Argentina) Matías Clavel
- League: Torneo Regional Federal Amateur
- 2019: 2°
| Home colours | Away colours |

Atlético Boxing Club is an Argentine football club located in the city of Río Gallegos, Santa Cruz. The team currently plays in Torneo Regional Federal Amateur, the regionalised fourth division of the Argentine football league system.

== History ==
The club was founded in 1920 by a group of neighbors. The name "Boxing Club" was suggested by the first deputy chairman of the club, Alfonso Martínez, a boxing fan.

Boxing Club had an important social role in the city of Río Gallegos, being responsible for creating the first volunteer fire department of Patagonia in February 1926.

In football, the Río Gallegos team is affiliated with Liga de Fútbol Sur. At domestic level, the Boxing Club got close to promote to Primera División in 1973, but the team lost to Cipolletti de Río Negro and All Boys de La Pampa, missing the chance to join the elite of Argentine football.

In 2014, Boxing Club won its first national title. The team of Río Gallegos was one of the winners of Torneo del Interior, defeating Banfield de Puerto Deseado at the final stage, therefore promoting to Torneo Federal B, the regional tournament that succeeded Torneo Argentino B.

== Team 2026 ==
october 11, 2026 Note: Flags indicate national team as defined under FIFA eligibility rules; some limited exceptions apply. Players may hold more than one non-FIFA nationality.

| No. | Pos. | Nation | Player |
|---|---|---|---|
| 1 | GK | ARG | Bruno Rojas |
| 7 | FW | ARG | Tobías Aguero |
| 8 | MF | ARG | Luciano Miño |

| No. | Pos. | Nation | Player |
|---|---|---|---|
| 9 | FW | ARG | Owen Soto |
| 10 | FW | ARG | Kevin Hevia |
| 11 | FW | ARG | Kevin Medina |

== Honours ==
=== National ===
- Torneo del Interior (1): 2014

=== Regional ===
- Liga de Fútbol Sur (19): 1963-64, 1964–65, 1967–68, 1968–69, 1970–71, 1974–75, 1975–76, 1976–77, 1986–87, 1987–88, 1991–92, 2005–06, 2006–07, 2007, 2011, 2014–15, 2016, 2017 y 2018.
