= 2026 CONCACAF U-20 Championship squads =

Association football tournament

The 2026 CONCACAF U-20 Championship was an international football tournament held in Mexico from 24 July to 9 August 2026. The twelve participating national teams were required to register a squad of up to 21 players, of which three had to be goalkeepers. Only players in these squads were eligible to take part in the tournament. The tournament exclusively required players to be born between 1 January 2007 and 31 December 2011 to be eligible, that is, they had to be a maximum of 19 years old and at least 16 years old by the end of the calendar year in which the competition was played.

Each national team had to submit a provisional list of a minimum of 21 and a maximum of 60 players (three of which had to be goalkeepers) to CONCACAF no later than thirty days prior to the start of the tournament. Players could be added or removed from the provisional list before the final list deadline. The final list of up to 21 players per national team had to be submitted to CONCACAF by 14 July 2024, ten days before the opening match of the tournament. All players in the final list had to be chosen from the respective provisional list. In the event that a player on the submitted final list suffered a serious injury or had medical reasons, he could be replaced up to 24 hours before the kick-off of his team's first match of the tournament, provided that it was approved by the CONCACAF Medical Committee. The replacement player had to come from the provisional list and would be assigned the shirt number of the replaced player.

CONCACAF published the final rosters on 17 July 2026.

The age listed for each player is on 24 July 2026, the first day of the tournament. A flag is included for coaches who are of a different nationality than their own national team.

== Group A ==
=== United States ===
Head coach: (Costa Rica) Gonzalo Segares

No.	Pos.	Player	Date of birth (age)	Club
1	GK	Kayne Rizvanovich	26 October 2007 (aged 18)	(United States Soccer Federation) Minnesota United FC
2	DF	Brandon Dayes	17 December 2008 (aged 17)	(United States Soccer Federation) Louisville City FC
3	DF	Joshua Torquato	24 July 2007 (aged 19)	(United States Soccer Federation) FC Dallas
4	DF	Chris Applewhite	23 August 2007 (aged 18)	(United States Soccer Federation) Nashville SC
5	DF	Braden Dunham	10 March 2007 (aged 19)	(United States Soccer Federation) Furman Paladins
6	MF	Colin Guske	29 January 2007 (aged 19)	(United States Soccer Federation) Orlando City SC
7	FW	Jaidyn Contreras	26 September 2007 (aged 18)	(United States Soccer Federation) FC Dallas
8	MF	Alex Shaw	3 April 2008 (aged 18)	(United States Soccer Federation) Inter Miami CF
9	FW	Dino Klapija	5 January 2007 (aged 19)	(German Football Association) RB Leipzig
10	MF	Santiago Morales	9 February 2007 (aged 19)	(United States Soccer Federation) Inter Miami CF
11	FW	Nimfasha Berchimas	22 February 2008 (aged 18)	(United States Soccer Federation) Charlotte FC
12	GK	William Lodmell	5 February 2008 (aged 18)	(Portuguese Football Federation) Sporting CP
13	DF	Tristan Brown	17 October 2007 (aged 18)	(United States Soccer Federation) Columbus Crew
14	MF	Javaun Mussenden	9 May 2007 (aged 19)	(United States Soccer Federation) New England Revolution
15	MF	Cooper Sanchez	26 March 2008 (aged 18)	(United States Soccer Federation) Atlanta United FC
16	MF	Dylan Vanney	29 November 2007 (aged 18)	(United States Soccer Federation) LA Galaxy
17	FW	Ruben Ramos Jr	22 January 2007 (aged 19)	(United States Soccer Federation) LA Galaxy
18	FW	Xanti Oyharçabal	15 February 2007 (aged 19)	(Royal Spanish Football Federation) Athletic Bilbao
19	FW	Colton Swan	3 May 2007 (aged 19)	(United States Soccer Federation) Charleston Battery
20	DF	Christopher Cupps	26 May 2008 (aged 18)	(United States Soccer Federation) Chicago Fire FC
21	GK	Lucas McPartlin	16 June 2007 (aged 19)	(United States Soccer Federation) St. Louis City SC

=== Cuba ===
Head coach: Sandro Sevillano

No.	Pos.	Player	Date of birth (age)	Club
1	GK	Héctor Leyva	24 April 2007 (aged 19)	(Football Association of Cuba) Guantánamo
2	DF	Yeasy Quiñones	5 May 2007 (aged 19)	(Football Association of Cuba) La Habana
3	MF	Erick Martín	13 February 2009 (aged 17)	(Football Association of Cuba) Villa Clara
4	DF	Miguel Morales	19 June 2007 (aged 19)	(Football Association of Cuba) Holguín
5	MF	Robert Zerquera	21 August 2007 (aged 18)	(Football Association of Cuba) Cienfuegos
6	MF	José Pérez	6 March 2007 (aged 19)	(Football Association of Cuba) Artemisa
7	FW	Jade Quiñones	23 September 2007 (aged 18)	(Football Association of Cuba) La Habana
8	MF	Enzo Viamontes	12 March 2007 (aged 19)	(Football Association of Cuba) La Habana
9	FW	Alexander Grave	19 June 2007 (aged 19)	(Football Association of Cuba) La Habana
10	FW	Didier Reinoso	31 March 2007 (aged 19)	(Football Association of Cuba) La Habana
11	FW	Alien Águila	15 August 2007 (aged 18)	(Football Association of Cuba) Villa Clara
12	GK	Yurixander Zayas	3 May 2007 (aged 19)	(Football Association of Cuba) Ciego de Ávila
13	FW	Alexandro Rojas	16 July 2008 (aged 18)	(Football Association of Cuba) Artemisa
14	FW	Yankarlos Iglesias	2 May 2009 (aged 17)	(Football Association of Cuba) La Habana
15	DF	Jennier Batista	6 April 2008 (aged 18)	(Football Association of Cuba) Ciego de Ávila
16	FW	Cristian Bravo	9 March 2008 (aged 18)	(Football Association of Cuba) Santiago de Cuba
17	MF	Pedro Carsado	29 August 2007 (aged 18)	(Football Association of Cuba) Santiago de Cuba
18	DF	Rainel Lavorit	10 December 2008 (aged 17)	(Football Association of Cuba) La Habana
19	FW	Rainiel Morales	28 April 2007 (aged 19)	(Football Association of Cuba) Mayabeque
20	MF	Deiby Borrell	4 April 2009 (aged 17)	(Football Association of Cuba) La Habana
21	GK	Camilo Diaz	25 November 2007 (aged 18)	(Football Association of Cuba) Villa Clara

=== El Salvador ===
Head coach: Erick Prado

No.	Pos.	Player	Date of birth (age)	Club
1	GK	Oliver Alegria	10 July 2008 (aged 18)	(Swiss Football Association) Zürich
2	DF	Jonathan Lopez	3 January 2007 (aged 19)	(Salvadoran Football Federation) Isidro Metapán
3	DF	Alexander White	8 February 2008 (aged 18)	(Canadian Soccer Association) Sigma FC
4	DF	Hugo Aguilar	22 June 2007 (aged 19)	(Salvadoran Football Federation) Isidro Metapán
5	DF	Itzel Colocho	14 March 2007 (aged 19)	(Royal Spanish Football Federation) Espanyol
6	DF	Diego Peña	25 April 2007 (aged 19)	(Salvadoran Football Federation) Alianza
7	FW	Christian Coreas	16 July 2007 (aged 19)	(United States Soccer Federation) University of San Diego
8	MF	Johann Ortiz	1 January 2007 (aged 19)	(United States Soccer Federation) Sporting Kansas City Academy
9	MF	Aiden Benitez	14 April 2007 (aged 19)	(United States Soccer Federation) University of Akron
10	MF	Gabriel Arnold	1 February 2007 (aged 19)	(United States Soccer Federation) LA Galaxy
11	MF	William Cabrera	9 May 2008 (aged 18)	(United States Soccer Federation) North Carolina FC
12	DF	Jose Gutierrez	8 February 2008 (aged 18)	(Salvadoran Football Federation) Águila
13	MF	Jefferson Roque	22 June 2007 (aged 19)	(Salvadoran Football Federation) Platense
14	DF	Emerson Guardado	9 September 2008 (aged 17)	(Salvadoran Football Federation) Alianza
15	DF	Jonathan Aguirre	24 February 2007 (aged 19)	(United States Soccer Federation) North Carolina FC Academy
16	DF	Anderson Portillo	5 August 2007 (aged 18)	(United States Soccer Federation) North Carolina FC
17	MF	Uriel Miranda	13 March 2007 (aged 19)	(Salvadoran Football Federation) Isidro Metapán
18	GK	Maximo Sandoval	4 January 2008 (aged 18)	(Salvadoran Football Federation) Hércules
19	FW	Luis Tobar	21 April 2008 (aged 18)	(Salvadoran Football Federation) Alianza
20	FW	Wilber Diaz	16 May 2007 (aged 19)	(Salvadoran Football Federation) FAS
21	GK	Peter Cornejo	30 October 2008 (aged 17)	(United States Soccer Federation) LA Surf Academy

=== Haiti ===
Head coach: (Cuba) Raúl González

No.	Pos.	Player	Date of birth (age)	Club
1	GK	Carlos Bre	12 January 2008 (aged 18)	(Haitian Football Federation) Real Hope
2	DF	Alcime Arthur	11 February 2008 (aged 18)	(Haitian Football Federation) Real Hope
3	DF	Stanley Volcin	28 December 2007 (aged 18)	(Haitian Football Federation) Capoise
4	DF	Tanis Marckidens	20 April 2007 (aged 19)	(Haitian Football Federation) Capoise
5	MF	Miguel Joseph	14 September 2009 (aged 16)	(Jamaica Football Federation) Mount Pleasant
6	MF	Josué Anglade	22 October 2008 (aged 17)	(Haitian Football Federation) Capoise
7	FW	Elikenson Jean	6 June 2007 (aged 19)	(Haitian Football Federation) Real Hope
8	MF	Ramy Fabius	27 September 2008 (aged 17)	(Haitian Football Federation) Real Hope
9	FW	Clavens Exantus	21 June 2008 (aged 18)	(Haitian Football Federation) Violette
10	FW	Franco Celestin	20 December 2008 (aged 17)	(Jamaica Football Federation) Mount Pleasant
11	FW	Emerson Laisse	19 August 2009 (aged 16)	(Jamaica Football Federation) Mount Pleasant
12	GK	Guivenson Jean Philippe	24 March 2007 (aged 19)	(Haitian Football Federation) Racing Gonaïves
13	MF	John Peter Charles	16 November 2008 (aged 17)	(Haitian Football Federation) Real Hope
14	DF	Dieuvens Resil	5 January 2008 (aged 18)	(Jamaica Football Federation) Mount Pleasant
15	DF	Mikenlove Jean Jules	23 November 2008 (aged 17)	(Haitian Football Federation) Violette
16	FW	Dabens Jacquet	5 January 2008 (aged 18)	(Haitian Football Federation) Aigle Noir
17	DF	Medinel Zamor	1 January 2008 (aged 18)	(Haitian Football Federation) SLG Académie
18	FW	Nikolai Pierre	1 April 2008 (aged 18)	(United States Soccer Federation) Orlando City SC Academy
19	FW	Kervens Romulus	22 November 2008 (aged 17)	(Haitian Football Federation) Racing Haïtien
20	FW	Will Leconte	23 December 2008 (aged 17)	(Haitian Football Federation) Baltimore
21	GK	Clifford Gene	9 June 2009 (aged 17)	(Jamaica Football Federation) Mount Pleasant

== Group B ==
=== Mexico ===
Mexico announced their 21-man final squad on 13 July 2026.

Head coach: Alex Diego

No.	Pos.	Player	Date of birth (age)	Club
1	GK	Sebastián Liceaga	11 April 2007 (aged 19)	(Mexican Football Federation) Guadalajara
2	DF	Juan Echilvestre	7 April 2007 (aged 19)	(Mexican Football Federation) Santos Laguna
3	DF	Cristóbal Alfaro	23 May 2007 (aged 19)	(Mexican Football Federation) Atlante
4	DF	Carlos Hernández (captain)	1 April 2007 (aged 19)	(Mexican Football Federation) Guadalajara
5	DF	Edwin Soto	29 January 2007 (aged 19)	(Mexican Football Federation) Pachuca
6	MF	Henrique Simeone	12 June 2007 (aged 19)	(Mexican Football Federation) Tigres UANL
7	MF	Luis Gómez	2 January 2007 (aged 19)	(Mexican Football Federation) Santos Laguna
8	MF	Juan Sigala	6 April 2007 (aged 19)	(Mexican Football Federation) Juárez
9	FW	Aldahir Valenzuela	13 April 2007 (aged 19)	(Mexican Football Federation) Monterrey
10	MF	Santiago Sandoval	7 August 2007 (aged 18)	(Mexican Football Federation) Guadalajara
11	FW	Hugo Camberos	21 January 2007 (aged 19)	(Mexican Football Federation) Guadalajara
12	GK	Cristo Navarrete	14 January 2007 (aged 19)	(Mexican Football Federation) Guadalajara
13	MF	Diego Covarrubias	8 February 2007 (aged 19)	(Mexican Football Federation) Guadalajara
14	DF	Yohan Orozco	11 March 2007 (aged 19)	(Mexican Football Federation) Guadalajara
15	DF	Luis Carmona	17 January 2007 (aged 19)	(Mexican Football Federation) Juárez
16	MF	Nelson Cedillo	21 March 2007 (aged 19)	(Mexican Football Federation) Santos Laguna
17	FW	Luis Gamboa	25 October 2008 (aged 17)	(Mexican Football Federation) Atlas
18	MF	Samir Inda	7 October 2007 (aged 18)	(Mexican Football Federation) Tapatío
19	FW	Diego Reyes	3 September 2007 (aged 18)	(Brazilian Football Confederation) Flamengo
20	FW	Diego Ramírez	15 January 2007 (aged 19)	(Mexican Football Federation) Tigres UANL
21	GK	Artemio Olvera	28 April 2007 (aged 19)	(Mexican Football Federation) Atlético San Luis

=== Costa Rica ===
Head coach: Rándall Row

No.	Pos.	Player	Date of birth (age)	Club
1	GK	Ian Orourke	9 May 2008 (aged 18)	(Costa Rican Football Federation) Saprissa
2	FW	Yerlan Sosa	6 April 2008 (aged 18)	(Costa Rican Football Federation) Alajuelense
3	DF	Matias Cordero	31 October 2007 (aged 18)	(Costa Rican Football Federation) Saprissa
4	DF	Emmanuel Brenes	25 March 2008 (aged 18)	(Costa Rican Football Federation) Cartaginés
5	MF	Deylan Aguilar	6 January 2007 (aged 19)	(Costa Rican Football Federation) Alajuelense
6	MF	Jeremi Hernandez	24 May 2007 (aged 19)	(Costa Rican Football Federation) Sporting San José
7	FW	Gabriel Sibaja	19 November 2008 (aged 17)	(Costa Rican Football Federation) Herediano
8	MF	Emmanuel Hernandez	31 January 2007 (aged 19)	(Costa Rican Football Federation) San Carlos
9	MF	David Garro	11 October 2007 (aged 18)	(Costa Rican Football Federation) Saprissa
10	MF	Dax Palmer	8 February 2007 (aged 19)	(Royal Spanish Football Federation) Alcorcón
11	FW	Kionell Estrada	16 October 2007 (aged 18)	(Costa Rican Football Federation) Herediano
12	FW	Matias Wanchope	31 August 2007 (aged 18)	Unattached
13	GK	Saul Duran	13 June 2007 (aged 19)	(Argentine Football Association) River Plate
14	DF	Isaac Brown	18 February 2007 (aged 19)	(United States Soccer Federation) University of Wisconsin
15	FW	Adriel Perez	7 March 2008 (aged 18)	(Costa Rican Football Federation) Alajuelense
16	FW	Kaden Farrier	21 December 2008 (aged 17)	(Costa Rican Football Federation) Sporting San José
17	DF	Ethan Barley	18 April 2009 (aged 17)	(Costa Rican Football Federation) Alajuelense
18	GK	Marshall Alfaro	10 November 2008 (aged 17)	(Costa Rican Football Federation) Herediano
19	DF	Duane Valentine	1 December 2007 (aged 18)	(Costa Rican Football Federation) Herediano
20	FW	Walter Ramirez	19 January 2007 (aged 19)	(Costa Rican Football Federation) Jicaral
21	FW	Keyner Hernandez	21 October 2008 (aged 17)	(Costa Rican Football Federation) Uruguay de Coronado

=== Guatemala ===
Head coach: (Argentina) Sebastian Bini

No.	Pos.	Player	Date of birth (age)	Club
1	GK	Alvaro Medrano	6 February 2007 (aged 19)	(United States Soccer Federation) Woodstock Academy
2	DF	Jorge Gonzalez	24 November 2007 (aged 18)	(National Football Federation of Guatemala) Antigua
3	DF	Brayan Guerra	14 November 2008 (aged 17)	(National Football Federation of Guatemala) Comunicaciones
4	DF	Samuel Camacho	14 April 2008 (aged 18)	(National Football Federation of Guatemala) Comunicaciones
5	DF	Paolo Arreaga	29 August 2008 (aged 17)	(National Football Federation of Guatemala) Municipal
6	MF	Steven Rivas	12 August 2008 (aged 17)	(United States Soccer Federation) D.C. United
7	FW	Yordi Aguilar	5 November 2007 (aged 18)	(National Football Federation of Guatemala) Guastatoya
8	DF	Omar Bolaños	13 January 2008 (aged 18)	(United States Soccer Federation) Houston Dynamo FC
9	FW	Oscar de León	2 April 2007 (aged 19)	(National Football Federation of Guatemala) Xelajú
10	FW	Marvin Avila	17 March 2008 (aged 18)	(National Football Federation of Guatemala) Antigua
11	MF	Jeferson Ruano	1 April 2008 (aged 18)	(Royal Spanish Football Federation) Tenerife
12	GK	Rogelio Barrera	19 March 2007 (aged 19)	(Brazilian Football Confederation) Ibrachina Futebol Clube
13	MF	Selvin Sagastume	23 November 2007 (aged 18)	(National Football Federation of Guatemala) Antigua
14	MF	Ricardo Marquez	9 January 2007 (aged 19)	(National Football Federation of Guatemala) Xelajú
15	MF	Pablo Arias	25 February 2008 (aged 18)	(National Football Federation of Guatemala) Municipal
16	DF	Jeffrey Interiano	10 May 2009 (aged 17)	(United States Soccer Federation) New York City FC
17	DF	Emir Ponciano	22 February 2007 (aged 19)	(National Football Federation of Guatemala) América de Chimaltenango
18	FW	Julio Ramos	24 April 2008 (aged 18)	(Royal Spanish Football Federation) Gimnàstic
19	MF	Justin Pacay	8 February 2007 (aged 19)	(National Football Federation of Guatemala) Santa Lucía
20	MF	Patick Arana	14 March 2009 (aged 17)	(Canadian Soccer Association) CF Montréal Academy
21	GK	Allan Fernandez	14 January 2008 (aged 18)	(National Football Federation of Guatemala) Antigua

=== Antigua and Barbuda ===
Head coach: Schyan Jeffers

No.	Pos.	Player	Date of birth (age)	Club
1	GK	Gavin Gonsalves	24 April 2008 (aged 18)	(United States Soccer Federation) Miami Strikers FC
2	DF	Jordan Francis	26 May 2007 (aged 19)	(Antigua and Barbuda Football Association) Aston Villa
3	DF	Ivan Grant	22 August 2007 (aged 18)	(Antigua and Barbuda Football Association) Guydadli
4	DF	Joshua Roache	25 December 2008 (aged 17)	(Antigua and Barbuda Football Association) All Saints United
5	FW	Jevaughn Jarvis	30 January 2007 (aged 19)	(Antigua and Barbuda Football Association) Garden Stars FC
6	MF	Dajari Barthley	13 November 2007 (aged 18)	(Antigua and Barbuda Football Association) Aston Villa
7	MF	Satchell Brandon	12 March 2008 (aged 18)	(Antigua and Barbuda Football Association) Masterballerz
8	MF	Obediah Browne	25 July 2008 (aged 17)	(Antigua and Barbuda Football Association) Old Road
9	MF	Blake Philogene	28 October 2009 (aged 16)	Unattached
10	MF	Vaughn Jackson	22 September 2008 (aged 17)	(Antigua and Barbuda Football Association) Aston Villa
11	DF	Conroy Brown	8 April 2007 (aged 19)	(German Football Association) Wattenscheid 09
12	DF	Seth Layne	27 February 2008 (aged 18)	(United States Soccer Federation) Combine Soccer Academy
13	DF	Elijah Whyte	15 March 2007 (aged 19)	(Antigua and Barbuda Football Association) Green City
14	MF	Brenden Skillings	27 November 2008 (aged 17)	(United States Soccer Federation) One FC
15	MF	Zidaan Williams	2 April 2008 (aged 18)	Unattached
16	MF	Sedique Adams	9 October 2007 (aged 18)	(Antigua and Barbuda Football Association) All Saints United
17	MF	Jermarion Edwards	13 September 2008 (aged 17)	(Antigua and Barbuda Football Association) Green City
18	GK	Tegan Gumbs	26 April 2007 (aged 19)	Unattached
19	MF	Lauchland Thomas	21 July 2007 (aged 19)	Unattached
20	FW	Marco Michael	30 May 2008 (aged 18)	Unattached
21	GK	Mekhi Phillip	16 July 2010 (aged 16)	(Antigua and Barbuda Football Association) North Coast FC

== Group C ==
=== Canada ===
Canada announced their 21-man final squad on 17 July 2026. On 26 July, Canada Soccer announced that alternates Valter Sedin and Marsel Bibishkov had been added to the squad to replace the injured Shola Jimoh and Jesse Saputo; additionally, Aleksandr Guboglo became unavailable due to a recent club transfer.

Head coach: (United States) Jesse Marsch

No.	Pos.	Player	Date of birth (age)	Club
1	GK	Nathaniel Abraham	23 April 2007 (aged 19)	(United States Soccer Federation) University of Louisville
2	DF	Aleksandr Guboglo	7 March 2007 (aged 19)	(French Football Federation) Reims
3	DF	Clovis Archange	1 July 2008 (aged 18)	(United States Soccer Federation) Orlando City SC
4	MF	Dylan Judelson	5 June 2008 (aged 18)	(United States Soccer Federation) Orlando City B
5	DF	Anyole Peter	18 June 2007 (aged 19)	(Canadian Soccer Association) Whitecaps FC Academy
6	DF	Félix Samson	26 October 2007 (aged 18)	(United States Soccer Federation) FC Cincinnati 2
7	FW	Marsel Bibishkov	11 April 2007 (aged 19)	(Canadian Soccer Association) Vancouver FC
8	MF	Emrick Fotsing	27 September 2007 (aged 18)	(Canadian Soccer Association) Vancouver FC
9	FW	Owen Graham-Roache	8 February 2008 (aged 18)	(Canadian Soccer Association) CF Montréal
10	DF	Liam Mackenzie	15 March 2007 (aged 19)	(Canadian Soccer Association) Vancouver Whitecaps FC
11	MF	Lucas Lima	27 April 2007 (aged 19)	(Portuguese Football Federation) Chaves U19
12	GK	Jonathan Ransom	8 January 2008 (aged 18)	(United States Soccer Federation) Atlanta United 2
13	DF	Richard Chukwu	25 February 2008 (aged 18)	(Canadian Soccer Association) Toronto FC
14	MF	Timothy Fortier	22 December 2008 (aged 17)	(Canadian Soccer Association) Toronto FC Academy
15	MF	Max Vogele	27 March 2007 (aged 19)	(Swedish Football Association) IFK Stocksund
16	DF	Sergei Kozlovskiy	18 June 2008 (aged 18)	(Canadian Soccer Association) Atlético Ottawa
17	MF	Zayne Bruno	23 January 2007 (aged 19)	(Canadian Soccer Association) Forge FC
18	MF	Valter Sedin	28 February 2007 (aged 19)	(Swedish Football Association) Hammarby IF
19	FW	Marius Aiyenero	23 May 2008 (aged 18)	(United States Soccer Federation) Los Angeles FC 2
20	MF	Antone Bossenberry	14 August 2008 (aged 17)	(Canadian Soccer Association) Toronto FC II
21	GK	Izan Server	2 February 2007 (aged 19)	(Royal Spanish Football Federation) Celta Vigo U19

=== Honduras ===
Head coach: Orlando Lopez

No.	Pos.	Player	Date of birth (age)	Club
1	GK	Angel Guevara	3 May 2007 (aged 19)	(National Autonomous Federation of Football of Honduras) Lobos UPNFM
2	DF	Kevin Perez	2 April 2009 (aged 17)	(National Autonomous Federation of Football of Honduras) Génesis
3	DF	Jose Rodriguez	1 February 2010 (aged 16)	(Royal Spanish Football Federation) Barcelona
4	DF	Kendry Villafuerte	17 July 2007 (aged 19)	(United States Soccer Federation) Inter Miami CF
5	DF	Jeffrey Ramos	29 May 2007 (aged 19)	(National Autonomous Federation of Football of Honduras) Real Sociedad
6	DF	Yeremy David	26 April 2007 (aged 19)	(National Autonomous Federation of Football of Honduras) Olimpia
7	MF	Jaylor Fernandez	27 October 2007 (aged 18)	(National Autonomous Federation of Football of Honduras) Marathón
8	MF	Victor Salazar	1 October 2007 (aged 18)	(National Autonomous Federation of Football of Honduras) Real España
9	FW	David Flores	13 January 2008 (aged 18)	(National Autonomous Federation of Football of Honduras) Olimpia
10	MF	Nicolas Balbas	8 May 2008 (aged 18)	(Royal Spanish Football Federation) Deportivo La Coruña
11	FW	Richard Martinez	27 May 2007 (aged 19)	(Royal Spanish Football Federation) Girona
12	GK	Noel Valladares	10 August 2008 (aged 17)	(National Autonomous Federation of Football of Honduras) Olimpia
13	DF	Kesdy Sevilla	11 January 2008 (aged 18)	(National Autonomous Federation of Football of Honduras) Victoria
14	MF	Arbin Medrano	3 February 2007 (aged 19)	(National Autonomous Federation of Football of Honduras) Juticalpa
15	FW	Jainer Bermudez	18 September 2008 (aged 17)	(National Autonomous Federation of Football of Honduras) Olimpia
16	MF	Mike Arana	22 January 2009 (aged 17)	(National Autonomous Federation of Football of Honduras) Real España
17	MF	Yochua Palacios	22 February 2008 (aged 18)	(National Autonomous Federation of Football of Honduras) Real España
18	MF	Sam Valle	1 October 2007 (aged 18)	(United States Soccer Federation) Springfield South County Youth Club
19	FW	Milton Moya	24 February 2009 (aged 17)	(National Autonomous Federation of Football of Honduras) Real España
20	DF	Roger Reyes	29 May 2007 (aged 19)	(National Autonomous Federation of Football of Honduras) Olancho
21	GK	Alan Cury	15 May 2008 (aged 18)	(Royal Spanish Football Federation) Damm

=== Jamaica ===
Head coach: Rodolph Austin

No.	Pos.	Player	Date of birth (age)	Club
1	GK	Joshua Grant	27 May 2007 (aged 19)	(United States Soccer Federation) FC Naples
2	DF	Demario McIntosh	17 August 2007 (aged 18)	(United States Soccer Federation) New England Revolution
3	DF	Jaquan Brown	6 May 2008 (aged 18)	(Jamaica Football Federation) Portmore United
4	DF	Dante Plunkett	9 October 2008 (aged 17)	(The Football Association) Manchester United
5	FW	Cai McLean	27 June 2008 (aged 18)	(United States Soccer Federation) Inter Miami CF
6	MF	Owen Jumpp	1 September 2008 (aged 17)	(Jamaica Football Federation) Mount Pleasant
7	FW	Jahmarie Nolan	11 November 2008 (aged 17)	(Canadian Soccer Association) Toronto FC
8	MF	Jermaine Young	2 June 2007 (aged 19)	(Portuguese Football Federation) Casa Pia
9	FW	Giovanni Taylor	9 January 2008 (aged 18)	(Jamaica Football Federation) Arnett Gardens
10	MF	Jabarie Howell	2 December 2007 (aged 18)	(Jamaica Football Federation) Mount Pleasant
11	MF	Jahmani Bell	11 October 2007 (aged 18)	(United States Soccer Federation) Houston Dynamo FC
12	FW	Sean Leighton	17 September 2008 (aged 17)	(Jamaica Football Federation) Chapelton Maroons
13	GK	Johnoi Steadman	31 December 2008 (aged 17)	(Jamaica Football Federation) St. Elizabeth Technical High School
14	DF	Duwayne Burgher	7 July 2009 (aged 17)	(Jamaica Football Federation) Waterhouse
15	FW	Jamone Lyle	10 July 2009 (aged 17)	(Jamaica Football Federation) Waterhouse
16	DF	Raequan Campbell-Dennis	30 January 2008 (aged 18)	(Canadian Soccer Association) Toronto FC Academy
17	MF	Santana Headley	4 October 2007 (aged 18)	(Jamaica Football Federation) Portmore United
18	MF	Kimarly Scott	23 May 2007 (aged 19)	(Jamaica Football Federation) Cavalier
19	DF	Brandon Bent	27 June 2008 (aged 18)	(United States Soccer Federation) Miami FC
20	MF	Che Gardner	26 May 2007 (aged 19)	(The Football Association) Stockport County
21	GK	Justin Murray	15 April 2008 (aged 18)	(Jamaica Football Federation) Glenmuir High School

=== Panama ===
Head coach: Mike Stump

No.	Pos.	Player	Date of birth (age)	Club
1	GK	Alberto Ruiz	19 February 2007 (aged 19)	(Panamanian Football Federation) Tauro
2	DF	Anthony Ramos	9 April 2008 (aged 18)	(Panamanian Football Federation) Plaza Amador
3	DF	Oliver Campos	17 March 2007 (aged 19)	(Panamanian Football Federation) Alianza
4	DF	Josue Wood	18 September 2007 (aged 18)	(Panamanian Football Federation) San Francisco
5	MF	Robben Benitez	4 April 2008 (aged 18)	(Panamanian Football Federation) Sporting San Miguelito
6	MF	Klissman de Gracia	13 May 2007 (aged 19)	(Panamanian Football Federation) Veraguas United
7	FW	Moisés Richards	3 February 2008 (aged 18)	(Hungarian Football Federation) Zalaegerszeg
8	MF	Carlos Rodriguez	9 August 2007 (aged 18)	(Panamanian Football Federation) Alianza
9	FW	Reynaldo Graham	28 August 2007 (aged 18)	(Panamanian Football Federation) Árabe Unido
10	DF	Joseph Choy	28 May 2009 (aged 17)	(Panamanian Football Federation) Academia Costa del Este
11	FW	Gerson Gordon	18 May 2008 (aged 18)	(Costa Rican Football Federation) Moravia
12	GK	Edward Cousin	31 December 2007 (aged 18)	(Panamanian Football Federation) San Francisco
13	FW	Luis Gomez	19 March 2007 (aged 19)	(Panamanian Football Federation) Academia Costa del Este
14	MF	Gino Sasso	2 August 2007 (aged 18)	(United States Soccer Federation) FC Dallas Academy
15	DF	Shayron Stewart	6 May 2008 (aged 18)	(Panamanian Football Federation) Bocas
16	MF	Edmilson González	30 May 2007 (aged 19)	(Panamanian Football Federation) Herrera
17	FW	Antony Perea	26 March 2007 (aged 19)	(Panamanian Football Federation) Tauro
18	MF	Ernesto Gómez	13 August 2007 (aged 18)	(United States Soccer Federation) Connecticut United FC
19	FW	Rahlen Cuello	28 February 2007 (aged 19)	(Costa Rican Football Federation) Alajuelense
20	MF	Simao Garcés	3 February 2008 (aged 18)	(Panamanian Football Federation) San Francisco
21	GK	Ellias Lozano	18 May 2007 (aged 19)	(Panamanian Football Federation) Plaza Amador
