= Diego Reyes (footballer, born 2007) =

Mexican footballer (born 2005)

Personal information
- Full name: Diego Reyes Costilla
- Date of birth: 3 September 2007 (age 19)
- Place of birth: Toluca, State of Mexico, Mexico
- Height: 1.76 m (5 ft 9 in)
- Position: Forward

Team information
- Current team: Flamengo (on loan from América)

Youth career
- 2021–: América
- 2026–: → Flamengo (loan)

Senior career*
Years	Team	Apps	(Gls)
2024–	América	2	(0)

International career^{‡}
2021–2022	Mexico U16	8	(0)
2024	Mexico U18	2	(0)
2026–	Mexico U20	6	(0)
Medal record
Men's football
Representing Mexico
CONCACAF U-20 Championship
Winner	2026 Mexico	Roster
- * Club domestic league appearances and goals as of 30 June 2026 ‡ National team caps and goals as of 11 September 2026

Diego Reyes Costilla (born 3 September 2007) is a Mexican professional footballer who plays as a forward for Flamengo, on loan from Liga MX club América.

== Early life ==
Reyes was born on 3 September 2007. Born in Toluca, Mexico, he is a native of the city.

== Club career ==
As a youth player, Reyes joined the youth academy of Mexican side América and was promoted to the club's senior team in 2024. During the spring of 2026, he joined the youth academy of Brazilian side Flamengo.

== International career ==
In July 2026, Reyes was called up by Alex Diego to participate with the Mexico under-20 team at the CONCACAF U-20 Championship. Mexico would go on to win the tournament.

== Style of play ==
Reyes plays as a forward. Spanish newspaper Marca wrote in 2026 that he "has stood out for his technique and mobility".

== Career statistics ==
=== Club ===
As of 27 June 2026

Appearances and goals by club, season and competition
Club	Season	League			Cup		Continental		Intercontinental		Other		Total	
Club	Season	Division	Apps	Goals	Apps	Goals	Apps	Goals	Apps	Goals	Apps	Goals	Apps	Goals
América	2024–25	Liga MX	2	0	—		—		—		—		2	0
Career total			2	0	0	0	0	0	0	0	0	0	2	0

== Honours ==
Mexico U20

- CONCACAF U-20 Championship: 2026
