= Juan Sigala =

Mexican footballer (born 2007)

Personal information
- Full name: Juan Alexander Sigala García
- Date of birth: 6 April 2007 (age 19)
- Place of birth: Delicias, Chihuahua, Mexico
- Height: 1.70 m (5 ft 7 in)
- Positions: Midfielder; right winger

Team information
- Current team: Juárez (on loan from Pachuca)
- Number: 16

Youth career
- 2018–2026: Pachuca

Senior career*
Years	Team	Apps	(Gls)
2025–	Pachuca	10	(1)
2026–	→ Juárez (loan)	3	(0)

International career^{‡}
2021–2022	Mexico U16	9	(0)
2024–2025	Mexico U18	2	(0)
2026–	Mexico U20	7	(2)
Medal record
Men's football
Representing Mexico
CONCACAF U-20 Championship
Winner	2026 Mexico	Roster
- * Club domestic league appearances and goals as of 17 October 2026 ‡ National team caps and goals as of 27 September 2026

Juan Alexander Sigala García (born 6 April 2007) is a Mexican professional footballer who plays as a midfielder or right winger for Liga MX club Juárez, on loan from Pachuca.

== Club career ==
Sigala began his football career by joining the youth academy of Pachuca in 2018, where he was assigned to the under-13 team before gradually progressing through several youth categories ahead of his senior debut.

On 16 March 2025, head coach Guillermo Almada called up Sigala to the senior team for the first time, with Sigala making his professional debut by coming off the bench for John Kennedy in the 73rd minute and scoring the fourth and final goal in Pachuca's 4–1 win over Tijuana. In doing so, he became Pachuca's fourth player to score on their professional debut and the first since Hirving Lozano in 2014.

On 16 June 2026, Sigala joined fellow Liga MX club Juárez on a season-long loan ahead of the 2026–27 season, with an obligation to buy.

== International career ==
In May 2024, Sigala received his first call-up to the Mexico under-18 team for the Canteras Tournament in Argentina.

On 19 March 2026, Sigala received his first call-up to the Mexico under-20 team for friendly matches against Costa Rica. On 27 March, in Mexico's first match against Costa Rica, Sigala made his debut for the under-20 team and scored his first goal in a 1–0 victory. Three days later, on 30 March, Sigala scored again in another 1–0 victory.

In July 2026, Sigala was called up by Alex Diego to participate with the Mexico under-20 team at the CONCACAF U-20 Championship. Mexico would go on to win the tournament.

== Career statistics ==
=== Club ===
As of match played on 17 October 2026

Appearances and goals by club, season and competition
Club	Season	League			Cup		Continental		Other		Total	
Club	Season	Division	Apps	Goals	Apps	Goals	Apps	Goals	Apps	Goals	Apps	Goals
Pachuca	2024–25	Liga MX	9	1	—		—		—		9	1
Pachuca	2025–26	Liga MX	1	0	—		—		—		1	0
Pachuca	Total		10	1	—		—		—		10	1
Juárez (loan)	2026–27	Liga MX	3	0	—		—		—		3	0
Total			13	1	0	0	0	0	0	0	13	1

== Honours ==
Mexico U20

- CONCACAF U-20 Championship: 2026
