= Jose Diaz =

Jose Diaz may refer to:

== Arts and journalism ==
- José María Díaz (1813–1888), Spanish journalist and playwright
- José Díaz Morales (1908–1976), Spanish journalist and film director
- José Pedro Díaz (1921–2006), Uruguayan essayist, educator and writer
- José Díaz-Balart (born 1960), American journalist

== Crime ==
- José Gallardo Díaz (1919–1942), Mexican-American man, victim of the Los Angeles Sleepy Lagoon murder

== Entertainment ==
- Jose "Pepi" Diaz, American attorney and The Apprentice contestant
- Joey Diaz (born 1963), Cuban American stand-up comedian

== Military ==
- José and Francisco Díaz (1777–1797), Puerto Rican soldiers who defended Puerto Rico against a British invasion in 1797
- José E. Díaz (1833–1867), Paraguayan general

== Politics ==
- José Díaz (Spanish politician) (1895–1942), Spanish politician
- José Celestino Díaz (1906–1987), Chilean mechanic and politician
- José Díaz (Uruguayan politician) (1932–2025), Uruguayan politician, minister of the interior
- José Ramón Díaz (born 1973), Puerto Rican Senator
- José Félix Díaz (born 1980), U.S. Republican politician from Florida

== Sports ==
- José Díaz (bobsleigh) (1907–1988), Mexican bobsledder
- José Díaz (footballer, born 1938), Argentine footballer
- José Antonio Díaz (fencer) (born 1938), Cuban fencer
- José Narciso Díaz (born 1950), Cuban Olympic fencer
- José Enrique Díaz (born 1953), Spanish football manager
- José Guadalupe Díaz (born 1954), Mexican football manager and former player
- José Díaz Pablo (born 1955), Spanish footballer
- José Díaz (weightlifter) (born 1959), Panamanian weightlifter
- José Díaz (rugby union) (born 1963), Spanish rugby union player
- Manolo Díaz (born 1968), Spanish football manager born José Manuel Díaz
- José Luis Díaz (footballer, born 1974), Argentinian footballer
- José Ignacio Díaz (born 1979), Spanish racewalker
- Joselo Díaz (born 1980), Major League Baseball player
- Jumbo Díaz (born 1984), Dominican baseball player
- José Daniel Díaz (born 1989), Venezuelan freestyle wrestler
- José Manuel Díaz (cyclist) (born 1995), Spanish cyclist
- José Díaz (weightlifter) (born 1959), Panamanian weightlifter

== See also ==
- José Antonio Díaz (disambiguation)
