= Luis Gómez (footballer, born 2007) =

Mexican footballer (born 2007)

Personal information
- Full name: Luis Ángel Gómez Bernal
- Date of birth: 2 January 2007 (age 19)
- Place of birth: Guadalajara, Jalisco, Mexico
- Height: 1.77 m (5 ft 10 in)
- Position: Central midfielder

Team information
- Current team: Santos Laguna
- Number: 193

Youth career
- 2021–: Santos Laguna

Senior career*
Years	Team	Apps	(Gls)
2024–	Santos Laguna	20	(0)

International career^{‡}
2022–2023	Mexico U16	8	(0)
2026–	Mexico U20	5	(0)
Medal record
Men's football
Representing Mexico
CONCACAF U-20 Championship
Winner	2026 Mexico	Roster
- * Club domestic league appearances and goals as of 6 November 2026 ‡ National team caps and goals as of 27 September 2026

Luis Ángel Gómez Bernal (born 2 January 2007) is a Mexican professional footballer who plays as a central midfielder for Liga MX club Santos Laguna.

== Club career ==
Gómez began his career at the academy of Santos Laguna, eventually making his professional debut on 21 April 2024 in a 0–2 loss to Pachuca where he was subbed in at the 84th minute.

== International career ==
In July 2026, Gómez was called up by Alex Diego to participate with the Mexico under-20 team at the CONCACAF U-20 Championship. Mexico would go on to win the tournament.

== Career statistics ==
As of match played on 6 November 2026

Club	Season	League			Cup		Continental		Other		Total	
Club	Season	Division	Apps	Goals	Apps	Goals	Apps	Goals	Apps	Goals	Apps	Goals
Santos Laguna	2023–24	Liga MX	1	0	—		—		—		1	0
Santos Laguna	2024–25	Liga MX	3	0	—		—		—		3	0
Santos Laguna	2025–26	Liga MX	8	0	—		—		—		8	0
Santos Laguna	2026–27	Liga MX	8	0	—		—		—		8	0
Career total			20	0	0	0	0	0	0	0	20	0

== Honours ==
Mexico U20

- CONCACAF U-20 Championship: 2026
