= Aldahir Valenzuela =

Mexican footballer (born 2005)

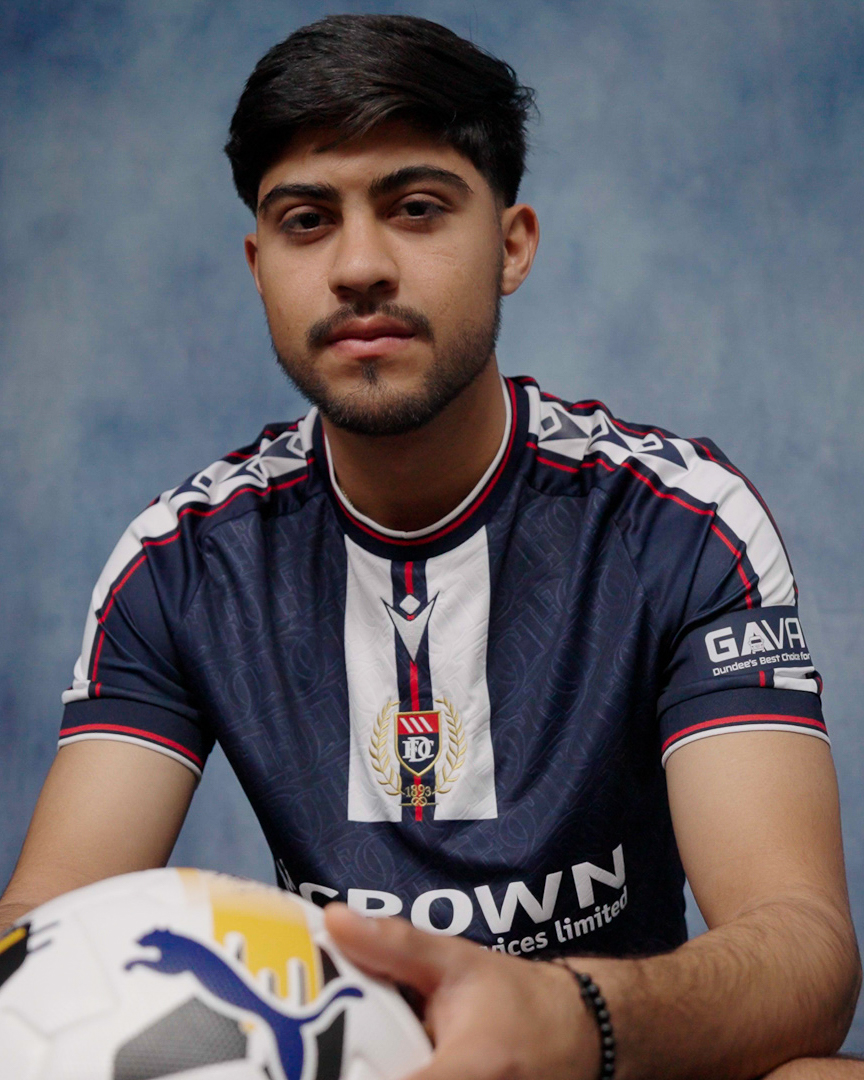
- Valenzuela for Dundee in 2026

Personal information
- Full name: Francisco Aldahir Valenzuela López
- Date of birth: 13 April 2007 (age 19)
- Place of birth: Tijuana, Baja California, Mexico
- Height: 1.84 m (6 ft 0 in)
- Position: Forward

Team information
- Current team: Monterrey
- Number: 206

Youth career
- Monterrey

Senior career*
Years	Team	Apps	(Gls)
2024–	Monterrey	1	(0)
2026	→ Dundee (loan)	1	(0)

International career
2022–2023	Mexico U16	5	(2)
2022–2023	Mexico U17	9	(0)
2024	Mexico U18	5	(1)
Medal record
Men's football
Representing Mexico
CONCACAF U-20 Championship
Winner	2026 Mexico	Roster
- * Club domestic league appearances and goals as of 1 June 2026

Francisco Aldahir Valenzuela López (born 13 April 2007) is a Mexican professional footballer who plays as a forward for Liga MX club Monterrey.

== Club career ==
As a youth player, joined the youth academy of Mexican side Monterrey and was promoted to the club's senior team in 2024, where he played in the Leagues Cup. Two years later, he was sent on loan to Scottish side Dundee. On 21 February 2026, Valenzuela made his Dundee debut in an away victory over Aberdeen.

== International career ==
Valenzuela is a Mexico youth international. During the autumn of 2023, he played for the Mexico national under-17 football team at the 2023 FIFA U-17 World Cup.

In July 2026, Valenzuela was called up by Alex Diego to participate with the Mexico under-20 team at the CONCACAF U-20 Championship. Mexico would go on to win the tournament.

== Style of play ==
Valenzuela plays as a forward. Mexican newspaper El Debate wrote in 2026 that "he primarily plays as a left winger, although he can also play as a striker, standing out for his physical strength and attacking prowess".

== Career statistics ==
=== Club ===
As of 3 April 2026

Appearances and goals by club, season and competition
Club	Season	League			Cup		Continental		Club World Cup		Other		Total	
Club	Season	Division	Apps	Goals	Apps	Goals	Apps	Goals	Apps	Goals	Apps	Goals	Apps	Goals
Monterrey	2024–25	Liga MX	1	0	—		1 (Note: Appearances in the CONCACAF Champions Cup)	0	—		1 (Note: Appearances in Leagues Cup)	0	3	0
Dundee	2025–26	Scottish Premiership	1	0	—		—		—		—		1	0
Career total			2	0	0	0	1	0	0	0	1	0	4	0

== Honours ==
Mexico U20

- CONCACAF U-20 Championship: 2026
