= Luis Gamboa =

Mexican footballer (born 2008)

Personal information
- Full name: Luis Mario Gamboa Carrillo
- Date of birth: 25 October 2008 (age 18)
- Place of birth: Veracruz, Veracruz, Mexico
- Height: 1.72 m (5 ft 8 in)
- Position: Winger

Team information
- Current team: Atlas
- Number: 251

Youth career
- 2022–: Atlas

Senior career*
Years	Team	Apps	(Gls)
2026–	Atlas	13	(0)

International career^{‡}
2023	Mexico U15	1	(0)
2023	Mexico U16	5	(1)
2024	Mexico U17	12	(4)
2025–	Mexico U18	1	(0)
2026–	Mexico U20	5	(1)
Medal record
Men's football
Representing Mexico
CONCACAF U-20 Championship
Winner	2026 Mexico	Roster
- * Club domestic league appearances and goals as of 24 May 2026 ‡ National team caps and goals as of 27 September 2026

Luis Mario Gamboa Carrillo (born 25 October 2008) is a Mexican professional footballer who plays as a winger for Liga MX club Atlas.

== Club career ==
As a youth player, Gamboa joined the youth academy of Atlas in 2022. He made his top-tier debut for the club on 8 February 2026 as a late substitute in a 2–2 Liga MX Clausura tie with UNAM.

== International career ==
Gamboa is a Mexico youth international. During November 2025, he played for the Mexico national under-17 football team at the 2025 FIFA U-17 World Cup, scoring two goals against Argentina.

In July 2026, Gamboa was called up by Alex Diego to participate with the Mexico under-20 team at the CONCACAF U-20 Championship. Mexico would go on to win the tournament.

== Career statistics ==
=== Club ===
As of 24 May 2026

Club	Season	League			Cup		Continental		Other		Total	
Club	Season	Division	Apps	Goals	Apps	Goals	Apps	Goals	Apps	Goals	Apps	Goals
Atlas	2025–26	Liga MX	13	0	—		—		—		13	0
Career total			13	0	0	0	0	0	0	0	13	0

== Honours ==
Mexico U20

- CONCACAF U-20 Championship: 2026
