= Yohan Orozco =

Mexican footballer (born 2007)

Personal information
- Full name: Yohan Ernesto Orozco Palacios
- Date of birth: 11 March 2007 (age 19)
- Place of birth: Jalisco, Mexico
- Height: 1.85 m (6 ft 1 in)
- Position: Defender

Team information
- Current team: Guadalajara
- Number: 214

Youth career
- 2023–: Guadalajara

International career^{‡}
| Years | Team | Apps | (Gls) |
| 2024 | Mexico U19 | 1 | (0) |
| 2026– | Mexico U20 | 6 | (1) |
Medal record
Men's football
Representing Mexico
CONCACAF U-20 Championship
| Winner | 2026 Mexico | Roster |
- ‡ National team caps and goals as of 27 September 2026

Yohan Ernesto Orozco Palacios (born 11 March 2007) is a Mexican professional footballer who plays as a defender for Liga MX club Guadalajara.

== International career ==
In July 2026, Orozco was called up by Alex Diego to participate with the Mexico under-20 team at the CONCACAF U-20 Championship. Mexico would go on to win the tournament.

In September 2026, Orozco was called up by Rafael Márquez for the senior national team as a training player.

== Honours ==
Mexico U20

- CONCACAF U-20 Championship: 2026
