= Hugo Camberos =

Mexican footballer (born 2007)

Personal information
- Full name: Hugo Camberos Figueroa
- Date of birth: 21 January 2007 (age 19)
- Place of birth: Autlán, Jalisco, Mexico
- Height: 1.67 m (5 ft 6 in)
- Position: Winger

Team information
- Current team: Guadalajara
- Number: 14

Youth career
- 2019–2024: Guadalajara

Senior career*
Years	Team	Apps	(Gls)
2024–2025	Tapatío	33	(7)
2025–	Guadalajara	40	(4)

International career^{‡}
2022	Mexico U15	4	(0)
2022–2023	Mexico U16	8	(2)
2021	Mexico U17	2	(1)
2024–	Mexico U19	1	(0)
2025–	Mexico U20	8	(4)
2026–	Mexico	2	(0)
Medal record
Men's football
Representing Mexico
CONCACAF U-20 Championship
Winner	2026 Mexico	Roster
- * Club domestic league appearances and goals as of 20 October 2026 ‡ National team caps and goals as of 6 October 2026

Hugo Camberos Figueroa (born 21 January 2007) is a Mexican professional footballer who plays as a winger for Liga MX club Guadalajara and the Mexico national team.

== Club career ==
Camberos began his career at the youth academy of Guadalajara. He made his professional debut in January 2024 with Tapatío, the reserve squad of Guadalajara.

On 11 January 2025, Camberos made his debut with Guadalajara, playing in a league match against Santos Laguna winning 1–0. On 15 February, Camberos scored his first goal with Chivas but also contributed an own goal in a 2–1 loss against Toluca. At the end of the season, he won the Best Rookie award.

== International career ==
In 2025, Camberos was called up by coach Eduardo Arce to represent Mexico at the FIFA U-20 World Cup held in Chile, scoring a brace against the host nation in a 4–1 win.

In July 2026, Camberos was called up by Alex Diego to participate with Mexico at the CONCACAF U-20 Championship. He would score 5 goals in the tournament, including the match-winning goal in the 2–1 semi-final victory against Canada, helping Mexico win the title after defeating rivals the United States 2–0 in the final; he would also go on to win the Golden Boot and Golden Ball.

On 29 September 2026, Camberos made his debut for the senior Mexico national team in a friendly against Peru.

== Career statistics ==
=== Club ===
As of match played on 20 October 2026

Club	Season	League			Cup		Continental		Intercontinental		Other		Total	
Club	Season	Division	Apps	Goals	Apps	Goals	Apps	Goals	Apps	Goals	Apps	Goals	Apps	Goals
Guadalajara	2024–25	Liga MX	15	2	—		3 (Note: Appearances in CONCACAF Champions Cup)	0	—		—		18	2
Guadalajara	2025–26	Liga MX	16	2	—		—		—		1 (Note: Appearances in Leagues Cup)	0	17	2
Guadalajara	2026–27	Liga MX	9	0	—		—		—		1	0	10	0
Guadalajara	Total		40	4	—		3	0	—		2	0	45	4
Tapatío (loan)	2023–24	Liga de Expansión MX	16	2	—		—		—		—		16	2
Tapatío (loan)	2024–25	Liga de Expansión MX	17	5	—		—		—		—		17	5
Tapatío (loan)	Total		33	7	—		—		—		—		33	7
Career total			73	11	0	0	3	0	0	0	2	0	78	11

=== International ===
As of match played on 6 October 2026

Appearances and goals by national team and year
National team	Year	Apps	Goals
Mexico	2026	2	0
Total		2	0

== Honours ==
Tapatío

- Liga de Expansión MX: Apertura 2024

Mexico U20

- CONCACAF U-20 Championship: 2026

Individual

- Liga MX Best Rookie: 2024–25
- Liga MX All-Stars: 2025
- CONCACAF U-20 Championship Golden Ball: 2026
- CONCACAF U-20 Championship Golden Boot: 2026
- CONCACAF U-20 Championship Best XI: 2026
