= Santiago Sandoval (footballer) =

Mexican footballer (born 2007)

Personal information
- Full name: Santiago Sandoval González
- Date of birth: 7 August 2007 (age 19)
- Place of birth: Boca del Río, Veracruz, Mexico
- Height: 1.66 m (5 ft 5 in)
- Position: Attacking midfielder

Team information
- Current team: Guadalajara
- Number: 30

Youth career
- 2021–: Guadalajara

Senior career*
Years	Team	Apps	(Gls)
2025–	Guadalajara	47	(11)
2025	→ Tapatío (loan)	1	(1)

International career^{‡}
2026–	Mexico U20	4	(1)
2026–	Mexico	5	(0)
Medal record
Men's football
Representing Mexico
CONCACAF U-20 Championship
Winner	2026 Mexico	Roster
- * Club domestic league appearances and goals as of 8 November 2026 ‡ National team caps and goals as of 17 November 2026

Santiago Sandoval González (born 7 August 2007), is a Mexican professional footballer who plays as a attacking midfielder for Liga MX club Guadalajara and the Mexico national team.

== Club career ==
Sandoval began his career at the academy of Guadalajara, progressing through all categories, until making his professional debut on 27 July 2025, being subbed in at the 87th minute of a 0–1 loss to León and on 17 August 2025, he scored his first goal as a professional in a 1–2 loss to Juárez.

On May 9, 2026, during the second leg of the Clausura championship quarter-finals against Tigres UANL, Sandoval would score a brace, all within 3 minutes, to give Chivas a 2–0 home victory and help qualify them into the semifinals.

On 13 September 2026, Sandoval scored a brace against Pumas UNAM in a 3–0 home victory.

== International career ==
In July 2026, Sandoval was called up by Alex Diego to participate with the Mexico under-20 team at the CONCACAF U-20 Championship. Mexico would go on to win the tournament.

On 29 September 2026, Sandoval made his debut for the Mexico national team in a friendly against Peru.

== Career statistics ==
=== Club ===
As of match played on 8 November 2026

Club	Season	League			Cup		Continental		Global		Other		Total	
Club	Season	Division	Apps	Goals	Apps	Goals	Apps	Goals	Apps	Goals	Apps	Goals	Apps	Goals
Guadalajara	2025–26	Liga MX	34	6	—		—		—		—		34	6
Guadalajara	2026–27	Liga MX	13	5	—		—		—		1 (Note: Appearances in Leagues Cup)	0	14	5
Guadalajara	Total		47	11	—		—		—		1	0	48	11
Tapatío (loan)	2025–26	Liga de Expansión MX	1	1	—		—		—		—		1	1
Career total			48	12	0	0	0	0	0	0	1	0	49	12

=== International ===
As of match played on 17 November 2026

Appearances and goals by national team and year
National team	Year	Apps	Goals
Mexico	2026	5	0
Total		5	0

== Personal life ==
He is the son of former footballer Luis Alonso Sandoval.

== Honours ==
Mexico U20

- CONCACAF Under-20 Championship: 2026

Individual

- Liga MX All-Star: 2026
- Liga MX Player of the Month: September 2026
