= Juan Echilvestre =

Mexican footballer (born 2007)

Personal information
- Full name: Juan Carlos Echilvestre Medina
- Date of birth: 7 April 2007 (age 19)
- Place of birth: Lerdo, Durango, Mexico
- Height: 1.75 m (5 ft 9 in)
- Position: Full-back

Team information
- Current team: Santos Laguna
- Number: 185

Youth career
- 2021–: Santos Laguna

Senior career*
Years	Team	Apps	(Gls)
2026–	Santos Laguna	3	(0)

International career^{‡}
2026–	Mexico U20	6	(1)
Medal record
Men's football
Representing Mexico
CONCACAF U-20 Championship
Winner	2026 Mexico	Roster
- * Club domestic league appearances and goals as of 27 September 2026 ‡ National team caps and goals as of 27 September 2026

Juan Carlos Echilvestre Medina (born 7 April 2007) is a Mexican professional footballer who plays as a full-back for Liga MX club Santos Laguna.

== Club career ==
Echilvestre began his career at the academy of Santos Laguna, eventually making his professional debut on 3 March 2026 in a 1–2 loss to Cruz Azul where he was subbed in at the 66th minute.

== International career ==
In July 2026, Echilvestre was called up by Alex Diego to participate with the Mexico under-20 team at the CONCACAF U-20 Championship. Mexico would go on to win the tournament.

In September 2026, Echilvestre was called up by Rafael Márquez for the senior national team as a training player.

== Career statistics ==
As of 27 September 2026

Club	Season	League			Cup		Continental		Other		Total	
Club	Season	Division	Apps	Goals	Apps	Goals	Apps	Goals	Apps	Goals	Apps	Goals
Santos Laguna	2025–26	Liga MX	3	0	—		—		—		3	0
Career total			3	0	0	0	0	0	0	0	3	0

== Honours ==
Mexico U20

- CONCACAF U-20 Championship: 2026
