= Henrique Simeone =

Mexican footballer (born 2007)

Personal information
- Full name: Henrique Simeone Koifman
- Date of birth: 12 June 2007 (age 19)
- Place of birth: Rio de Janeiro, Brazil
- Height: 1.82 m (6 ft 0 in)
- Position: Midfielder

Team information
- Current team: Tigres UANL
- Number: 34

Youth career
- –2025: Botafogo
- 2025–: Tigres UANL

Senior career*
Years	Team	Apps	(Gls)
2026–	Tigres UANL	6	(0)

International career^{‡}
2026–	Mexico U20	6	(0)
Medal record
Men's football
Representing Mexico
CONCACAF U-20 Championship
Winner	2026 Mexico	Roster
- * Club domestic league appearances and goals as of 7 November 2026 ‡ National team caps and goals as of 27 September 2026

Henrique Simeone Koifman (born 12 June 2007) is a professional footballer who plays as a midfielder for Tigres UANL. Born in Brazil, he has been called up to represent Mexico internationally at youth level.

== Early life ==
Simeone was born in Rio de Janeiro, Brazil, to a Mexican father and a Brazilian mother.

== Club career ==
As a youth player, Simeone joined the youth academy of Brazilian side Botafogo. Following his stint there, he joined the youth academy of Mexican side Tigres UANL during September 2025 and was promoted to the club's senior team in 2026.

== International career ==
In July 2026, Simeone was called up by Alex Diego to participate with Mexico at the CONCACAF U-20 Championship. He would go on to help Mexico win the tournament.

In September 2026, Simeone was called-up by Rafael Márquez for the senior national team as a training player.

== Style of play ==
Simeone plays as a midfielder. Spanish news website Bolavip wrote in 2026 that "besides his exceptional ball-winning ability, he possesses remarkable vision and passing skills that make him a very dynamic player".

== Career statistics ==
=== Club ===
As of match played on 7 November 2026

Club	Season	League			Cup		Continental		Other		Total	
Club	Season	Division	Apps	Goals	Apps	Goals	Apps	Goals	Apps	Goals	Apps	Goals
Tigres UANL	2025–26	Liga MX	2	0	—		—		—		2	0
Tigres UANL	2026–27	Liga MX	4	0	—		—		—		4	0
Career total			6	0	0	0	0	0	0	0	6	0

== Honours ==
Mexico U20

- CONCACAF U-20 Championship: 2026

Individual

- CONCACAF U-20 Championship Best XI: 2026
