= 2012 Beijing Hyundai International Youth Football Tournament =

Under-19 age football group competition

Tournament details
- Country: China
- Dates: 7–11 September 2012
- Teams: 4

Final positions
- Champions: France
- Runners-up: Mexico

Tournament statistics
- Matches played: 12
- Goals scored: 20 (1.67 per match)

The 2012 Beijing Hyundai International Youth Football Tournament was an under-19 age group competition that took place on 7-9 September 2012.

The competition was sponsored by Hyundai, a corporate sponsor of the China national football team.

== Final table ==
Team	Pld	W	D	L	GF	GA	GD	Pts
France	3	2	1	0	6	2	4	7
Mexico	3	2	0	1	9	5	4	6
China	3	0	2	1	2	6	-4	2
North Korea	3	0	1	2	3	7	-4	1

== Results ==
7 September 2012
15:00

China	0–0	France
	report

7 September 2012
19:30

Mexico	3–1	North Korea
	report

9 September 2012

China	1–5	Mexico

9 September 2012
19:30

North Korea	1–2	France

11 September 2012
16:00

China	1–1	North Korea
	report

11 September 2012
19:30

Mexico	1–3	France
