= Neo Lima Stacziwa =

Mexican footballer (born 2007)

Personal information
- Full name: Neo Constantino Lima Stacziwa
- Date of birth: 7 December 2007 (age 18)
- Place of birth: New York City, New York, United States
- Height: 1.82 m (6 ft 0 in)
- Position: Midfielder

Team information
- Current team: SC Paderborn II
- Number: 8

Youth career
- Kickers 94 Markkleeberg
- –2020: VfB Zwenkau 02
- 2020–2022: 1. FC Lokomotive Leipzig
- 2022–2025: Erzgebirge Aue
- 2025–: SC Paderborn

Senior career*
Years	Team	Apps	(Gls)
2025	Erzgebirge Aue	0	(0)
2025–	SC Paderborn II	11	(1)

International career^{‡}
2026–	Mexico U20	2	(0)
- * Club domestic league appearances and goals as of 23 September 2026 ‡ National team caps and goals as of 26 June 2026

Neo Constantino Lima Stacziwa (born 7 December 2007) is a professional footballer who plays as a midfielder for Regionalliga West club SC Paderborn II. Born in the United States, he is a Mexico youth international.

== Early life ==
Stacziwa was born on 7 December 2007. Born in New York City, New York, United States, he was born to a German mother and a Mexican father.

== Club career ==
As a youth player, Stacziwa joined the youth academy of German side Kickers 94 Markkleeberg. Following his stint there, he joined the youth academy of German side VfB Zwenkau 02. Subsequently, he joined the youth academy of German side 1. FC Lokomotive Leipzig.

During the summer of 2022, he joined the youth academy of German side Erzgebirge Aue and was promoted to the club's senior team in 2025, where he made zero league appearances and scored zero goals. Ahead of the 2025–26 season, he joined the youth academy of German side SC Paderborn and was promoted to the club's reserve team the same year.

== Style of play ==
Stacziwa plays as a midfielder. Mexican news website TV Azteca wrote in that he "is known for his excellent game reading and ability to get forward into scoring positions".

== Career statistics ==
=== Club ===
As of 26 June 2026

Appearances and goals by club, season and competition
Club	Season	League			Cup		Continental		Intercontinental		Other		Total	
Club	Season	Division	Apps	Goals	Apps	Goals	Apps	Goals	Apps	Goals	Apps	Goals	Apps	Goals
SC Paderborn II	2025–26	Regionalliga West	2	0	—		—		—		—		2	0
Career total			2	0	0	0	0	0	0	0	0	0	2	0
