= Raúl González (football manager, born 1952) =

Spanish football manager

Personal information
- Full name: Julio Raúl González Pérez
- Date of birth: 23 October 1952 (age 74)
- Place of birth: Avilés, Spain

Managerial career
- Years: Team
- 1981–1983: Ensidesa
- 1983–1984: Avilés
- 1985: Mosconia
- 1985–1987: Zamora
- 1987–1989: Avilés
- 1989–1990: Equatorial Guinea
- 1990–1991: Villarreal
- 1991–1992: Ponferradina
- 1992–1993: Hispano
- 1993–1994: Avilés
- 1994–1995: Candás
- 1997–1998: Avilés
- 2000–2001: Caudal
- 2001–2002: Pontevedra
- 2002–2005: Alcorcón
- 2005–2006: Zamora
- 2006–2007: Alcorcón
- 2007–2008: Burgos
- 2008–2009: Oviedo
- 2012–2014: Tuilla
- 2015: Langreo
- 2019: Candás
- 2019: Candás

Julio Raúl González Pérez (born 23 October 1952), known as Raúl González, is a Spanish football manager.
