= 2026 CONCACAF U-20 Championship =

International men's association football tournament

Campeonato Sub-20 de la Concacaf 2026

Tournament details
- Host country: Mexico
- Dates: 24 July – 9 August
- Teams: 12 (from 1 confederation)
- Venues: 3 (in 2 host cities)

Final positions
- Champions: Mexico (15th title)
- Runners-up: United States

Tournament statistics
- Matches played: 25
- Goals scored: 82 (3.28 per match)
- Top scorer: (Mexico) Hugo Camberos (5 goals)
- Best player: (Mexico) Hugo Camberos
- Best goalkeeper: (Mexico) Cristo Navarrete
- Fair play award: Mexico

The 2026 CONCACAF Under-20 Championship was the ninth edition of the CONCACAF Under-20 Championship (30th edition if all eras included), the biennial men's under-20 international association football tournament organized by CONCACAF. It was held in Mexico from 24 July to 9 August 2026.

As with the 2024 edition, 12 teams competed in three groups of four teams each followed by an eight-team knockout round. The tournament results determined CONCACAF's representatives at the 2027 FIFA U-20 World Cup in Azerbaijan and Uzbekistan, 2027 Pan American Games in Lima, and the men's football tournament at the 2028 Summer Olympics in Los Angeles.

== Qualification ==
CONCACAF announced the qualification format in November 2025. As the six highest-ranked Under-20 teams in CONCACAF, the United States, Mexico, Honduras, Panama, Cuba, and Guatemala received byes to the final tournament. Thirty-two teams were drawn into six groups to play single round-robin matches with the six group winners qualifying.

Qualified teams (Note: CONCACAF U-20 ranking is in parentheses)
Received bye to final tournament	Entered through qualifying
United States (1); Mexico (2); Honduras (3); Panama (4); Cuba (5); Guatemala (6)	Costa Rica (7); El Salvador (8); Canada (9); Haiti (11); Jamaica (12); Antigua and Barbuda (16)

== Venues ==
Location of the host cities of the 2026 CONCACAF U-20 Championship.

On 7 May 2026, CONCACAF released the match schedule and list of venues after the group draw.

Puebla		Mexico City
Estadio Universitario BUAP	Estadio Cuauhtémoc	Estadio Banorte
Capacity: 19,283	Capacity: 51,726	Capacity: 87,523

== Format ==
CONCACAF announced the tournament format in November 2025 (Sections 12.5–12.10):

- Group stage: Twelve teams were drawn into three groups of four teams to play single round-robin matches. The winners and runners-up from each group and the two highest-ranked third-place teams advanced to the knockout stage.
- Knockout stage: The eight teams advancing from the group stage were seeded, with group winners ranked 1–3, runners-up 4–6, and third-place teams 7 and 8. The first- and eighth-seeded teams, the second- and seventh-seeded teams, the third- and sixth-seeded teams, and the fourth- and fifth-seeded teams faced off in quarter-finals 1–4, respectively. The winners of quarter-finals 1 and 4, and the winners of quarter-finals 2 and 3 met in the semi-finals, with the winners of those matches contesting the final.

The tournament determined the CONCACAF participants in the following tournaments (Sections 5.2–5.3):

- The four highest-placed teams affiliated with FIFA qualified for the 2027 FIFA U-20 World Cup. (Note: As all teams taking part were FIFA-affiliated, the four semi-finalists qualified.)
- The tournament champion and the highest-placed teams from each of the Caribbean, Central American, and North American regions qualified for the 2027 Pan American Games.
- The highest-placed team affiliated with the IOC qualified for the 2028 Olympics. If that team had been the United States, which had qualified as the host nation, then the second-highest placed team would have qualified. (Note: As all teams taking part were IOC-affiliated, the tournament champion or, if the winner had been the United States, the runner-up qualified.)

== Draw ==
On 7 May 2026, CONCACAF held the group stage draw. The 12 qualified teams were divided into four pots of three teams each based on the CONCACAF ranking prior to qualification. Teams were drawn from Pot 1 into Groups A, B and C, in order, followed by teams from Pots 2, 3 and 4.

Draw pots (Note: Numbers in parentheses indicate the CONCACAF ranking prior to qualification)
Pot 1	Pot 2	Pot 3	Pot 4
United States (1); Mexico (2); Honduras (3)	Panama (4); Cuba (5); Guatemala (6)	Costa Rica (7); El Salvador (8); Canada (9)	Haiti (11); Jamaica (12); Antigua and Barbuda (16)

== Squads ==
Each team was required to register a squad of up to 21 players, three of whom had to be goalkeepers.

== Group stage ==
Group stage matches were held from 24 July to 1 August. All match times are UTC−6.

Tie-breaking criteria for group stage ranking
The ranking of teams in each group was determined by the points obtained in all group matches. If two or more teams were equal on points, the following criteria were used to determine the ranking:
1. Superior goal difference in all group matches;
2. Most goals scored in all group matches;

If, after having applied criteria a to b, teams still had an equal ranking, criteria a to b were reapplied exclusively to the matches between the teams who were still level to determine their final rankings. (Note: When there were two or more teams tied on points, criteria a to b were applied. After these criteria were applied, they may have defined the position of some of the teams involved, but not all of them. For example, if there was a three-way tie on points, the application of the first three criteria may only have broken the tie for one of the teams, leaving the other two teams still tied. In this case, the tiebreaking procedure was resumed, from the beginning, for those teams that were still tied.) If this procedure did not lead to a decision, criteria c to g applied.

3. Most points obtained in the group matches played between the teams concerned;
4. Superior goal difference in the group matches played between the teams concerned;
5. Most goals scored in the group matches played between the teams concerned;
6. Highest team conduct ("fair play") score in all group matches (only one deduction could be applied to a player or team coach/official in a single match):
  - Yellow card: −1 point;
  - Indirect red card (second yellow card): −3 points;
  - Direct red card: −4 points;
  - Yellow card and direct red card: −5 points;
7. Better position in the most recent CONCACAF Under-20 ranking.

=== Group A ===
Pos	Team	Pld	W	D	L	GF	GA	GD	Pts	Qualification
1	United States	3	3	0	0	11	0	+11	9	Knockout stage
2	Haiti	3	2	0	1	5	6	−1	6	Knockout stage
3	Cuba	3	1	0	2	5	8	−3	3	
4	El Salvador	3	0	0	3	1	8	−7	0	

Source: CONCACAF
Rules for classification: Tiebreakers
25 July 2026
15:00

Cuba	3–0	El Salvador
Reinoso 18'; Águila 36'; R. Morales 89'	Report

Estadio Universitario BUAP, Puebla
Referee: Jorge Ojeda (Nicaragua)
25 July 2026
20:00

United States	3–0	Haiti
Klapija 38'; Ramos 62' (pen.); Morales 89' (pen.)	Report

Estadio Universitario BUAP, Puebla
Referee: Michael Venne (Canada)

28 July 2026
15:00

Haiti	3–2	Cuba
Joseph 16'; Celestine 34' (pen.); Jacquet 90+1'	Report	Iglesias 80'; Zerquera 90+4'

Estadio Universitario BUAP, Puebla
Referee: Nikolai Nyron (Trinidad and Tobago)
28 July 2026
20:00

El Salvador	0–3	United States
	Report	Klapija 35' (pen.); Ramos 61' (pen.); Cupps 89'

Estadio Universitario BUAP, Puebla
Referee: Félix Mojica (Nicaragua)

31 July 2026
15:00

El Salvador	1–2	Haiti
Coreas 56' (pen.)	Report	Exantus 22'; Jacquet 62'

Estadio Universitario BUAP, Puebla
Referee: Ismael López (Mexico)
31 July 2026
20:00

United States	5–0	Cuba
Ramos 2'; Shaw 26'; Dayes 75'; Torquato 78'; Vanney 82'	Report

Estadio Universitario BUAP, Puebla
Referee: Jorge Leira (Panama)

=== Group B ===
Pos	Team	Pld	W	D	L	GF	GA	GD	Pts	Qualification
1	Mexico (H)	3	3	0	0	9	0	+9	9	Knockout stage
2	Costa Rica	3	2	0	1	5	3	+2	6	Knockout stage
3	Guatemala	3	1	0	2	4	5	−1	3	Knockout stage
4	Antigua and Barbuda	3	0	0	3	1	11	−10	0	

Source: CONCACAF
Rules for classification: Tiebreakers
(H) Hosts
24 July 2026
14:00

Guatemala	0–1	Costa Rica
	Report	K. Hernández 77'

Estadio Cuauhtémoc, Puebla
Referee: Adonis Carrasco (Dominican Republic)
24 July 2026
17:00

Mexico	3–0	Antigua and Barbuda
Camberos 13' (pen.); Valenzuela 22'; Sandoval 45+2'	Report

Estadio Cuauhtémoc, Puebla
Referee: Jorge Leira (Panama)

27 July 2026
17:00

Antigua and Barbuda	0–4	Guatemala
	Report	De León 14'; Ramos 38'; González 82'; Guerra 86'

Estadio Cuauhtémoc, Puebla
Referee: Eric De La Cruz (Cuba)
27 July 2026
20:00

Costa Rica	0–2	Mexico
	Report	Camberos 42' (pen.); Brenes 59' (o.g.)

Estadio Cuauhtémoc, Puebla
Referee: Guido Gonzales (United States)

30 July 2026
16:00

Costa Rica	4–1	Antigua and Barbuda
Palmer 9'; Barley 58'; Sosa 70' (pen.); Estrada 78'	Report	Jackson 54'

Estadio Cuauhtémoc, Puebla
Referee: Jorge Ojeda (Nicaragua)
30 July 2026
19:00

Mexico	4–0	Guatemala
Ramírez 45'; Camberos 54'; Gamboa 65'; Cedillo 89'	Report

Estadio Cuauhtémoc, Puebla
Referee: Michael Venne (Canada)

=== Group C ===
Pos	Team	Pld	W	D	L	GF	GA	GD	Pts	Qualification
1	Canada	3	1	2	0	6	3	+3	5	Knockout stage
2	Jamaica	3	1	2	0	6	5	+1	5	Knockout stage
3	Panama	3	1	1	1	6	5	+1	4	Knockout stage
4	Honduras	3	0	1	2	2	7	−5	1	

Source: CONCACAF
Rules for classification: Tiebreakers
26 July 2026
14:00

Panama	0–3	Canada
	Report	Fotsing 9', 90+5'; Mackenzie 14' (pen.)

Estadio Universitario BUAP, Puebla
Referee: Ismael López (Mexico)
26 July 2026
19:00

Honduras	1–2	Jamaica
Salazar 75'	Report	Nolan 22'; Bent 90+5'

Estadio Universitario BUAP, Puebla
Referee: Cristhofer Corado (Guatemala)

29 July 2026
14:00

Jamaica	2–2	Panama
Nolan 62'; Brown 90+6'	Report	Richards 13'; Gordón 22'

Estadio Universitario BUAP, Puebla
Referee: Waldir García (El Salvador)
29 July 2026
19:00

Canada	1–1	Honduras
Lima 57'	Report	Martínez 64'

Estadio Universitario BUAP, Puebla
Referee: Shavin Greene (Guyana)

1 August 2026
14:00

Canada	2–2	Jamaica
Sedin 56'; Aiyenero 79' (pen.)	Report	Nolan 21'; Leighton 90+12' (pen.)

Estadio Universitario BUAP, Puebla
Referee: Guido Gonzales Jr (United States)
1 August 2026
19:00

Honduras	0–4	Panama
	Report	Wood 33'; Richards 42'; Gordón 45+4'; Rodríguez 69'

Estadio Universitario BUAP, Puebla
Referee: Adonis Carrasco (Dominican Republic)

=== Overall ranking of teams ===
Pos	Grp	Team	Pld	W	D	L	GF	GA	GD	Pts	Qualification
1	A	United States	3	3	0	0	11	0	+11	9	Knockout stage
2	B	Mexico	3	3	0	0	9	0	+9	9	Knockout stage
3	C	Canada	3	1	2	0	6	3	+3	5	Knockout stage
4	B	Costa Rica	3	2	0	1	5	3	+2	6	Knockout stage
5	A	Haiti	3	2	0	1	5	6	−1	6	Knockout stage
6	C	Jamaica	3	1	2	0	6	5	+1	5	Knockout stage
7	C	Panama	3	1	1	1	6	5	+1	4	Knockout stage
8	B	Guatemala	3	1	0	2	4	5	−1	3	Knockout stage
9	A	Cuba	3	1	0	2	5	8	−3	3	
10	C	Honduras	3	0	1	2	2	7	−5	1	
11	A	El Salvador	3	0	0	3	1	8	−7	0	
12	B	Antigua and Barbuda	3	0	0	3	1	11	−10	0	

Source: CONCACAF
Rules for classification: 1) Points; 2) Goal difference; 3) Goals scored; 4) Team conduct ("fair play") score; 5) Latest CONCACAF ranking.

== Knockout stage ==
The knockout stage used a single-elimination format, starting with the quarter-finals on 4 August and culminating with the final on 9 August. If the score was even after regulation time in a match, 30 minutes of extra time were added. If still tied after this, a penalty shoot-out determined the winner.

All match times are UTC−6.

=== Bracket ===
Quarter-finals
4 August – Puebla (Cuauhtémoc)
Costa Rica (p)	1 (5)
Haiti	1 (3)
4 August – Puebla (Cuauhtémoc)
United States	3
Guatemala	1
5 August – Puebla (Cuauhtémoc)
Canada (a.e.t.)	3
Jamaica	1
5 August – Puebla (Cuauhtémoc)
Mexico	4
Panama	0

Semi-finals
7 August – Mexico City
Costa Rica	0
United States	2
7 August – Mexico City
Canada	1
Mexico	2

Final
9 August – Mexico City
United States	0
Mexico	2

=== Quarter-finals ===
The quarter-final winners qualified for the 2027 FIFA U-20 World Cup.

4 August 2026
14:00

Costa Rica	1–1 (a.e.t.)	Haiti
Sosa 55' (pen.)	Report	Exantus 9'
Penalties
Sosa (penalty scored); Palmer (penalty scored); Garro (penalty scored); Leal (penalty scored); O'rourke (penalty scored)	5–3	(penalty scored) Pierre; (penalty scored) Charles; (penalty missed) Tanis; (penalty scored) Joseph

Estadio Cuauhtémoc, Puebla
Referee: Guido Gonzales Jr (United States)

4 August 2026
19:00

United States	3–1	Guatemala
Dayes 45+5'; Klapija 68'; Torquato 75'	Report	De León 36'

Estadio Cuauhtémoc, Puebla
Referee: Shavin Greene (Guyana)

5 August 2026
16:30

Canada	3–1 (a.e.t.)	Jamaica
Mackenzie 57', 94' (pen.); Vogele 116'	Report	Nolan 87' (pen.)

Estadio Cuauhtémoc, Puebla
Referee: Ismael López (Mexico)

5 August 2026
20:00

Mexico	4–0	Panama
Echilvestre 34'; Camberos 57'; Orozco 75'; Ramírez 88'	Report

Estadio Cuauhtémoc, Puebla
Referee: Michael Venne (Canada)

=== Semi-finals ===
7 August 2026
15:00

Costa Rica	0–2	United States
	Report	Ramos 37'; Applewhite 77'

Estadio Banorte, Mexico City
Referee: Jorge Leira (Panama)

The winner qualified for the 2027 Pan American Games and the 2028 Summer Olympics.

7 August 2026
21:00 (Note: Originally scheduled for 20:00, the match was delayed to 21:00 due to thunderstorms in the area.)

Canada	1–2	Mexico
Graham-Roache 6'	Report	Alfaro 49'; Camberos 78' (pen.)

Estadio Banorte, Mexico City
Referee: Cristhofer Corado (Guatemala)

=== Final ===
9 August 2026
17:00

United States	0–2	Mexico
	Report	Alfaro 28', 69'

Estadio Banorte, Mexico City
Referee: Adonis Carrasco (Dominican Republic)

== Statistics ==
=== Goalscorers ===
There were 82 goals scored in 25 matches, for an average of 3.28 goals per match.

5 goals

- (Mexico) Hugo Camberos

4 goals

- (Jamaica) Jahmarie Nolan
- (United States) Ruben Ramos Jr

3 goals

- (Canada) Liam Mackenzie
- (Mexico) Cristóbal Alfaro
- (United States) Dino Klapija

2 goals

- (Canada) Emrick Fotsing
- (Costa Rica) Yerlan Sosa
- (Guatemala) Óscar de León
- (Haiti) Clavens Exantus
- (Haiti) Da-Benz Jacquet
- (Mexico) Diego Ramírez
- (Panama) Gerson Gordón
- (Panama) Moisés Richards
- (United States) Brandon Dayes
- (United States) Joshua Torquato

1 goal

- (Antigua and Barbuda) Vaughn Jackson
- (Canada) Marius Aiyenero
- (Canada) Owen Graham-Roache
- (Canada) Lucas Lima
- (Canada) Valter Sedin
- (Canada) Max Vogele
- (Costa Rica) Ethan Barley
- (Costa Rica) Kionell Estrada
- (Costa Rica) Keyner Hernández
- (Costa Rica) Dax Palmer
- (Cuba) Alien Águila
- (Cuba) Yankarlos Iglesias
- (Cuba) Rainiel Morales
- (Cuba) Didier Reinoso
- (Cuba) Robert Zerquera
- (El Salvador) Christian Coreas
- (Guatemala) Mayron González
- (Guatemala) Brayan Guerra
- (Guatemala) Julio Ramos
- (Haiti) Franco Celestine
- (Haiti) Miguel Joseph
- (Honduras) Richard Martínez
- (Honduras) Víctor Salazar
- (Jamaica) Brandon Bent
- (Jamaica) Jaquan Brown
- (Jamaica) Sean Leighton
- (Mexico) Nelson Cedillo
- (Mexico) Juan Echilvestre
- (Mexico) Luis Gamboa
- (Mexico) Yohan Orozco
- (Mexico) Santiago Sandoval
- (Mexico) Aldahir Valenzuela
- (Panama) Carlos Rodríguez
- (Panama) Josué Wood
- (United States) Christopher Applewhite
- (United States) Christopher Cupps
- (United States) Santiago Morales
- (United States) Alexander Shaw
- (United States) Dylan Vanney

1 own goal

- (Costa Rica) Emmanuel Brenes (against Mexico)

Source: CONCACAF

=== Awards ===
The following awards were given at the conclusion of the tournament.

Award	Player
Golden Ball	(Mexico) Hugo Camberos
Golden Boot	(Mexico) Hugo Camberos (5 goals)
Golden Glove	(Mexico) Cristo Navarrete
Fair Play Award	Mexico

Best XI
Goalkeeper	Defenders	Midfielders	Forwards
(Mexico) Cristo Navarrete	(Mexico) Edwin Soto; (United States) Christopher Cupps; (Mexico) Cristóbal Alfaro; (Costa Rica) Yerlan Sosa	(Haiti) Miguel Joseph; (Mexico) Henrique Simeone; (Canada) Liam Mackenzie	(United States) Jaidyn Contreras; (United States) Ruben Ramos Jr; (Mexico) Hugo Camberos

== Qualification for international tournaments ==
=== Qualified teams for FIFA U-20 World Cup ===
The following four teams qualified for the 2027 FIFA U-20 World Cup in Azerbaijan and Uzbekistan.

Team	Qualified on	Previous appearances in FIFA U-20 World Cup (Note: Italic indicates hosts for that year.)
Costa Rica	4 August 2026	9 (1989, 1995, 1997, 1999, 2001, 2007, 2009, 2011, 2017)
United States	4 August 2026	18 (1981, 1983, 1987, 1989, 1993, 1997, 1999, 2001, 2003, 2005, 2007, 2009, 2013, 2015, 2017, 2019, 2023, 2025)
Canada	5 August 2026	8 (1979, 1985, 1987, 1997, 2001, 2003, 2005, 2007)
Mexico	5 August 2026	17 (1977, 1979, 1981, 1983, 1985, 1991, 1993, 1997, 1999, 2003, 2007, 2011, 2013, 2015, 2017, 2019, 2025)

=== Qualified teams for Pan American Games ===
The champion team and the top team from each of the three CONCACAF zones, i.e., Caribbean (CFU), Central America (UNCAF), and North America (NAFU), qualified for the 2027 Pan American Games men's football tournament.

The following four teams from CONCACAF qualified for the 2027 Pan American Games men's football tournament in Peru.

Team	Zone	Qualified on	Previous appearances in Pan American Games (Note: Bold indicates champions for that year. Italic indicates hosts for that year.)
Haiti	CFU	5 August 2026	4 (1959, 1971, 1991, 2007)
Costa Rica	UNCAF	5 August 2026	8 (1951, 1959, 1975, 1979, 1995, 1999, 2007, 2011)
United States	NAFU	7 August 2026	13 (1959, 1963, 1967, 1971, 1975, 1979, 1983, 1987, **1991**, 1995, 1999, 2007, 2023)
Mexico	NAFU	7 August 2026	16 (1955, 1959, **1967**, 1971, **1975**, 1983, 1987, 1991, 1995, **1999**, 2003, 2007, **2011**, 2015, 2019, 2023)

=== Qualified teams for 2028 Summer Olympics ===
The following two teams qualified for the 2028 Summer Olympics (the United States qualified as hosts):

Team	Qualified on	Previous appearances in Summer Olympics (Note: Bold indicates champions for that year. Italic indicates hosts for that year.)
United States	13 September 2017	15 (1904, 1924, 1928, 1936, 1948, 1952, 1956, 1972, 1984, 1988, 1992, 1996, 2000, 2008, 2024) (Note: The United States qualified for the 1980 Olympics, but led a boycott of the Games and were replaced by Cuba.)
Mexico	7 August 2026	12 (1928, 1948, 1964, 1968, 1972, 1976, 1992, 1996, 2004, **2012**, 2016, 2020)
