= Ruben Ramos Jr =

American soccer player (born 2007)

Rubén Ramos Jr.
Personal information
- Date of birth: January 22, 2007 (age 19)
- Place of birth: La Puente, California, United States
- Height: 5 ft 9 in (1.75 m)
- Position: Attacking midfielder

Team information
- Current team: Sporting Kansas City (on loan from LA Galaxy)
- Number: 24

Youth career
- LA Galaxy

Senior career*
Years	Team	Apps	(Gls)
2023–	Ventura County	46	(16)
2024–	LA Galaxy	14	(0)
2026–	→ Sporting Kansas City (loan)	0	(0)

International career^{‡}
2022	United States U15	4	(0)
2022	United States U16	3	(0)
2023	United States U17	3	(0)
2025–	United States U19	2	(0)
2024–	United States U20	6	(2)
Medal record
Men's football
Representing United States
CONCACAF U-20 Championship
Runner-up	2024 Mexico
- * Club domestic league appearances and goals as of September 12, 2026 ‡ National team caps and goals as of November 15, 2025

Rubén Ramos Jr (Spanish: Rubén, born January 22, 2007) is an American professional soccer player who plays as an attacking midfielder for Sporting Kansas City on loan from Major League Soccer club LA Galaxy.

== Club career ==
Ramos was named the U-15 MLS Next MVP for the 2021–22 season of the MLS Next. He began his senior career with Ventura County, the reserve team of LA Galaxy, in 2023 in the MLS Next Pro. He was named the La Galaxy Academy Player of the Year for the 2023 season. On 26 February 2024, he signed a contract as a Homegrown Player for La Galaxy; he was slated to stay with Ventura County for 2024, before moving to LA Galaxy in 2025.

On 12 July 2024, Ramos signed on a short-term agreement to LA Galaxy for a match against FC Dallas on 13 July 2024. On 14 July 2024, he again signed a short-term agreement with the club for a Major League Soccer match against Sporting Kansas City. He made his senior and professional debut with LA Galaxy as a substitute in a 4–0 MLS win over Sporting KC on 15 June 2024. On 30 August 2024, he formally signed with La Galaxy for the remainder 2024 Major League Soccer season until 2028.

On September 3, 2026, Ramos moved on loan to MLS side Sporting Kansas City for the remainder of the season.

== International career ==
Born in the United States, Ramos is of Mexican descent and holds dual-citizenship. He was represented the United States U15s for a camp in February 2022. He was part of the United States U20s that finished as runners-up at the 2024 CONCACAF U-20 Championship.

== Honors ==
LA Galaxy

- MLS Cup: 2024

International

- 2026 CONCACAF U20 Championship: Best XI
