= AD Alcorcón =

Spanish association football club

Alcorcón
- Full name: Agrupación Deportiva Alcorcón S.A.D.
- Nickname: Los Alfareros (The Potters)
- Short name: ADA
- Founded: 20 July 1971; 55 years ago
- Stadium: Estadio Municipal de Santo Domingo
- Capacity: 5,100
- Owner: Global Football Holdings
- President: Iván Bravo
- Head coach: Fran Justo
- League: Primera Federación – Group 2
- 2025–26: Primera Federación – Group 2, 11th of 20
- Website: www.adalcorcon.com
Home colours	Away colours

Agrupación Deportiva Alcorcón S.A.D. is a Spanish football team based in Alcorcón, in the autonomous community of Madrid. Founded in 1971, it currently plays in Primera Federación, holding home matches at the Municipal de Santo Domingo, with a 5,100-seat capacity.

== History ==
Founded in 1971 by Dionisio Muñoz Jerez. The founding act of the club was signed on 20 July that year. Alcorcón spent roughly its first 30 years of existence in between the fourth division and the regional leagues. Alcorcón played its first match on 8 September 1971 against Atlético Madrid (youth team) and lost it 0:2. In 2000–01, it made its Segunda División B debut, finishing in 12th place, and spending the following seasons immersed in mid-table positions. In the 2003–04 season, led by coach Raúl González, Alcorcón finished in 10th position in Segunda División B.

In 2008–09, a third place in the regular season meant Alcorcón was allowed to appear in the promotion play-offs for the first time in its history. After disposing of Sant Andreu and Alcoyano, the club was ousted by Real Unión of Irun in the final round with a 3–1 aggregate scoreline.

=== 2009–10 Copa del Rey ===
On 27 October 2009, Alcorcón secured the most famous victory in its history after it defeated La Liga powerhouse Real Madrid 4–0 at home in the first leg of its round-of-32 match in the Copa del Rey. In the club's first ever official match against a team from the top flight, its opponent fielded nine international players in its starting eleven: Jerzy Dudek, Álvaro Arbeloa, Raúl Albiol, Christoph Metzelder, Royston Drenthe, Mahamadou Diarra, Guti, Esteban Granero, Raúl, Rafael van der Vaart and Karim Benzema, with Ruud van Nistelrooy, Fernando Gago and Marcelo appearing as substitutes in the second-half.

On 10 November, in the second leg at the Santiago Bernabéu, the club lost 1–0, but won 4–1 on aggregate, thereby going through to the next round of 16, where the club was ousted by Racing de Santander, 2–3 on aggregate.

=== 2010–present ===
Following the Alcorconazo, in the 2009–10 season, Alcorcón was finally promoted to level two after defeating Pontevedra (3–0 on aggregate) and Ontinyent (4–3 on aggregate) in the promotion play-offs. In the second tier, the club played twice the promotion play-offs but were defeated by Real Valladolid in the final of the 2012 edition and by Girona in the semi-finals of the 2013 edition.

In 2017, Alcorcón qualified to the Copa del Rey quarter-finals for the first time in their history after a penalty shoot-out victory over Espanyol, but were beaten 2–0 on aggregate by Alavés. The club was 13th in the 2017–18 season in the Segunda División, just 4 points away from being relegated, and also struggled in the next campaign, but retained its place in Segunda División after finishing the season in the 14th position.

In June 2019, Roland Duchâtelet sold the club to a group led by American investor David Blitzer for around €13 million. In April 2022, Alcorcon was relegated to third division after defeated by Cartagena, ending their 12 years stay in second division. In 2023, AD Alcorcón signed a sponsorship deal with Hacksaw Gaming for the 2022/2023 season.

On 24 June 2023, AD Alcorcón secure promotion to Segunda División from 2023 to 2024 after defeating CD Castellon with an aggregate score of 1–2 in the promotion play-off Primera Federación and returned to the second tier after a one-year absence, but they were immediately relegated in the 2023–24 season.

== Season to season ==
Season	Tier	Division	Place	Copa del Rey
1971–72	6	3ª Reg.	1st	
1972–73	5	2ª Reg.	1st	
1973–74	5	1ª Reg.	2nd	
1974–75	4	Reg. Pref.	4th	
1975–76	4	Reg. Pref.	3rd	
1976–77	4	Reg. Pref.	5th	
1977–78	4	3ª	19th	First round
1978–79	5	Reg. Pref.	1st	
1979–80	4	3ª	3rd	Second round
1980–81	4	3ª	5th	First round
1981–82	4	3ª	9th	Second round
1982–83	4	3ª	12th	
1983–84	4	3ª	9th	
1984–85	4	3ª	4th	
1985–86	4	3ª	10th	Third round
1986–87	4	3ª	17th	
1987–88	4	3ª	19th	
1988–89	5	Reg. Pref.	3rd	
1989–90	5	Reg. Pref.	1st	
1990–91	4	3ª	19th	

Season	Tier	Division	Place	Copa del Rey
1991–92	5	Reg. Pref.	10th	
1992–93	5	Reg. Pref.	1st	
1993–94	4	3ª	16th	
1994–95	4	3ª	21st	
1995–96	5	Reg. Pref.	3rd	
1996–97	5	Reg. Pref.	2nd	
1997–98	4	3ª	20th	
1998–99	5	Reg. Pref.	1st	
1999–2000	4	3ª	5th	
2000–01	3	2ª B	12th	
2001–02	3	2ª B	16th	
2002–03	3	2ª B	7th	
2003–04	3	2ª B	10th	First round
2004–05	3	2ª B	11th	
2005–06	3	2ª B	7th	
2006–07	3	2ª B	11th	
2007–08	3	2ª B	14th	
2008–09	3	2ª B	3rd	
2009–10	3	2ª B	1st	Round of 16
2010–11	2	2ª	9th	Round of 32

Season	Tier	Division	Place	Copa del Rey
2011–12	2	2ª	4th	Round of 16
2012–13	2	2ª	5th	Third round
2013–14	2	2ª	9th	Round of 16
2014–15	2	2ª	11th	Second round
2015–16	2	2ª	7th	Second round
2016–17	2	2ª	18th	Quarter-finals
2017–18	2	2ª	13th	Second round
2018–19	2	2ª	14th	Third round
2019–20	2	2ª	10th	First round
2020–21	2	2ª	17th	Round of 32
2021–22	2	2ª	22nd	Second round
2022–23	3	1ª Fed.	2nd	Second round
2023–24	2	2ª	20th	Second round
2024–25	3	1ª Fed.	10th	First round
2025–26	3	1ª Fed.	11th	
2026–27	3	1ª Fed.		

- 13 seasons in Segunda División
- 4 seasons in Primera Federación
- 10 seasons in Segunda División B
- 15 seasons in Tercera División
- 14 seasons in Categorías Regionales

== Current squad ==
As of 4 November 2026.

Note: Flags indicate national team as defined under FIFA eligibility rules; some limited exceptions apply. Players may hold more than one non-FIFA nationality.

No.	Pos.	Nation	Player
1	GK	ESP	Oriol Martí
2	DF	ESP	Pol Domingo
3	DF	ESP	Arnau Gaixas
4	DF	ESP	Álvaro Mayorga
5	DF	ESP	Javi Lancho
6	MF	ESP	Pablo Rivera
7	FW	ESP	Esteban Aparicio
8	MF	ESP	Toni Caravaca
9	FW	ESP	Davo
10	MF	ESP	Luis Vacas
11	FW	MAR	Omar Ouhdadi
13	GK	ESP	Miguel Bañuz

No.	Pos.	Nation	Player
16	MF	ESP	Fran Manzanara
17	DF	ESP	Miguel Cuesta
18	MF	ESP	Gonzalo Melero
19	MF	CRC	Dax Palmer
20	FW	ESP	Miguel Berlanga
21	FW	ESP	Fran Sabina (on loan from Tenerife)
22	DF	ESP	Xabi Irurita
23	FW	ESP	Rober Ibáñez
24	DF	ESP	Lucas Pérez
30	FW	ESP	Nicola Di Domenico
35	DF	ESP	Diego Arcos

=== Reserve team ===
Note: Flags indicate national team as defined under FIFA eligibility rules; some limited exceptions apply. Players may hold more than one non-FIFA nationality.

No.	Pos.	Nation	Player
26	DF	MLI	Samou Koné
28	FW	ESP	Emilio Gutiérrez

No.	Pos.	Nation	Player
32	MF	ESP	Sergio Sáez

=== Out on loan ===
Note: Flags indicate national team as defined under FIFA eligibility rules; some limited exceptions apply. Players may hold more than one non-FIFA nationality.

No.	Pos.	Nation	Player

=== Current technical staff ===
Position	Staff
Manager	(Spain) Pablo Álvarez
Assistant manager	(Spain) Carlos Sánchez (Spain) Pepe Bermúdez
Fitness coach	(Spain) Luis Muñoz
Goalkeeping coach	(Spain) Víctor Miguel Fernández
Rehab fitness coach	(Spain) Aarón Fueyo
Analyst	(Spain) Maikel
Delegate	(Spain) Pedro Cañizares
Kit man	(Spain) Eduardo Alonso García (Spain) Agustín Tamames
Director of Medical Services	(Spain) Roberto Redondo
Doctor	(Spain) Miguel González
Physiotherapists	(Spain) Álex Rodríguez (Spain) Jorge Barañano

Last updated: July 2023
Source: AD Alcorcón (in Spanish)

== Notable coaches ==
- (Spain) José Díaz
- (Spain) Raúl González
- (Spain) Juan Antonio Anquela
- (Spain) José Bordalás
- (Spain) Julio Velázquez

== Reserve team ==
- AD Alcorcón B
