= Dylan Vanney =

American soccer player (born 2007)

Personal information
- Date of birth: November 29, 2007 (age 18)
- Place of birth: United States
- Height: 1.72 m (5 ft 8 in)
- Positions: Midfielder; winger

Team information
- Current team: Betis C (on loan from LA Galaxy)
- Number: 12

Youth career
- LA Galaxy

Senior career*
Years	Team	Apps	(Gls)
2024–2026	Ventura County FC	46	(12)
2026–	LA Galaxy	0	(0)
2026–	→ Betis C (loan)	2	(0)

International career^{‡}
2025–	United States U19	3	(0)
2026–	United States U20	5	(1)
- * Club domestic league appearances and goals as of 11 October 2026 ‡ National team caps and goals as of 9 August 2026

Dylan Vanney (born November 29, 2007) is an American professional soccer player who plays as a midfielder or winger for Betis C on loan from LA Galaxy.

== Early life ==
Vanney was born on 29 November 2007. Born in the United States, he is the son of United States international Greg Vanney.

The twin brother of American soccer player Mason Vanney, he is the older brother of American soccer player Christian Vanney.

== Club career ==
As a youth player, Vanney joined the youth academy of LA Galaxy, where he was awarded 2025 LA Galaxy Academy Player of the Year and was promoted to the club's reserve team in 2024, where he made forty-six league appearances and scored twelve goals and recorded six assists.

On 23 May 2026, he was first called up to their senior team during a 1–1 home draw with Houston Dynamo in the league. Ahead of the 2026–27 season, he was sent on loan to Spanish side Betis C.

== International career ==
Vanney is a United States youth international and has represented the country internationally at under-19 and under-20 level.

On 12 November 2025, he debuted for the United States men's national under-19 soccer team during a 2–1 away friendly win over the Germany national under-19 football team During the summer of 2026, he played for the United States men's national under-20 soccer team at the 2026 CONCACAF U-20 Championship.

== Style of play ==
Vanney plays as a midfielder or winger. America news website HOOLIGAN SOCCER wrote in 2026 that he "stands out for his versatility in attack and midfield. At VCFC, he played mainly as a left winger, but also performed as an attacking midfielder and an interior midfielder".
