= José Díaz Pablo =

Spanish footballer and manager

Personal information
- Full name: José Díaz Pablo
- Date of birth: 18 March 1945 (age 81)
- Place of birth: Madrid, Spain
- Position: Forward

Senior career*
Years	Team	Apps	(Gls)
1967–1968	Badalona	3	(0)
1968–1969	Onteniente	10	(1)
1969–1970	Alcalá		
1971–1974	Getafe Deportivo		
- Alcorcón

Managerial career
- 1979–1982: Alcorcón (youth)
- 1982–1986: Alcorcón
- 1986–1988: Leganés
- 1989–1990: Alcorcón
- 1990–1993: Talavera
- 1998–2000: Alcorcón
- * Club domestic league appearances and goals

José Díaz Pablo (born 18 March 1945) is a Spanish retired footballer who played as a forward, and is a former manager.

== Playing career ==
Born in Madrid, Díaz Pablo first arrived in Segunda División in 1967 with CF Badalona. He made his professional debut on 12 November 1967, starting in a 1–1 home draw against CE Europa.

In the 1968 summer Díaz Pablo moved to Onteniente CF, also in the second division. He scored his first professional goal on 29 September, but in a 1–2 away loss against Real Valladolid.

Díaz Pablo subsequently represented AD Alcorcón, and retired with the club.

== Managerial career ==
Immediately after retiring Díaz Pablo started working as a manager, coaching his former club Alcorcón's youth setup. He was promoted to the main squad in 1982, and was also in charge of the club for a further two spells, aside from spells at neighbouring sides CD Leganés and Talavera CF.
