= José Antonio Díaz =

José Antonio Díaz may refer to:

- Antonio Díaz (boxer), full name José Antonio Díaz (born 1976), Mexican world champion boxer
- José Antonio Caro (footballer, born 1994), full name José Antonio Caro Díaz, Spanish footballer
- José Antonio Díaz (fencer) (born 1938), Cuban Olympic fencer
- José Antonio Díaz García (born 1964), Mexican politician
- Joey Diaz (comedian), full name José Antonio "Joey Coco" Díaz (born 1963), American comedian and actor

== See also ==
- José Antonio Díez (born 1982), professional cyclist
