= Christopher Cupps =

American soccer player (born 2008)

Personal information
- Full name: Christopher John Cupps
- Date of birth: May 26, 2008 (age 18)
- Place of birth: Chicago, Illinois, United States
- Height: 1.90 m (6 ft 3 in)
- Position: Center-back

Team information
- Current team: Greenock Morton (on loan from Chicago Fire)
- Number: 4

Youth career
- 2017–2024: Chicago Fire

Senior career*
| Years | Team | Apps | (Gls) |
| 2024– | Chicago Fire II | 38 | (0) |
| 2025– | Chicago Fire | 6 | (0) |
| 2026– | → Greenock Morton (loan) | 7 | (0) |

International career^{‡}
| 2024 | United States U16 | 1 | (0) |
| 2024– | United States U17 | 9 | (0) |
| 2024– | United States U18 | 2 | (0) |
| 2026– | United States U20 | 4 | (1) |
- * Club domestic league appearances and goals as of 20:06, 8 November 2026 (UTC) ‡ National team caps and goals as of 00:25, September 12, 2026 (UTC)

Christopher John Cupps (born May 26, 2008) is an American professional soccer player who plays as a center-back for Scottish Championship side Greenock Morton on loan from Major League Soccer club Chicago Fire.

== Club career ==
Cupps is a youth product of Chicago Fire since 2017. In 2024, he started playing with their reserves in the MLS Next Pro. On February 18, 2025, he signed his first professional contract with Chicago Fire as a Homegrown Player until 2028, with options for 2029 and 2030. He debuted with the senior Chicago Fire team in a 3–1 U.S. Open Cup win over New England Revolution on May 21, 2025.

On 24 August 2026, Cupps joined Scottish Championship club Greenock Morton on loan until the end of 2026.

== International career ==
Cupps was called up to the United States U17s for the 2025 FIFA U-17 World Cup.
