= Valter Sedin =

Canadian soccer player (born 2007)

Personal information
- Date of birth: February 28, 2007 (age 19)
- Place of birth: Vancouver, British Columbia, Canada
- Position: Midfielder

Team information
- Current team: Whitecaps FC 2
- Number: 49

Youth career
- Fusion FC
- 2020–2025: Vancouver Whitecaps FC
- 2025–2026: Hammarby

Senior career*
Years	Team	Apps	(Gls)
2023	Whitecaps FC Academy	1	(0)
2024	Whitecaps FC 2	1	(0)
2026–	Whitecaps FC 2	5	(0)
2026	→ Vancouver Whitecaps FC (loan)	0	(0)

International career^{‡}
2025	Canada U18	1	(0)
2025–	Canada U20	7	(1)
- * Club domestic league appearances and goals as of September 26, 2026 ‡ National team caps and goals as of August 8, 2026

Valter Sedin (born February 28, 2007) is a Canadian soccer player who plays for Whitecaps FC 2 in MLS Next Pro. He is the son of Swedish former hockey player Henrik Sedin.

== Early life ==
Sedin played youth soccer with Fusion FC and joined the Whitecaps FC Pre-Academy in August 2020. In 2022, he won the Whitecaps Academy U15 Student-Athlete Award and in 2024, won the U17 Student-Athlete Award.

== Club career ==
In 2023, Sedin began playing with the Whitecaps FC Academy in League1 British Columbia.

On June 30, 2024, Sedin made his professional debut with Whitecaps FC 2 in MLS Next Pro, as an academy call-up, against St. Louis City 2.

In February 2025, he joined the U19 team of Swedish club Hammarby.

In August 2026, he signed a professional contract with Whitecaps FC 2, through June 2028. In September 2026, he joined the Vancouver Whitecaps FC on a short-term loan.

== International career ==
Sedin is eligible to represent both Sweden and Canada.

In November 2023 and May 2024, he was invited to a training camps for 2007-born players with the Sweden U17 team.

In August 2025, he was called up to the Canada U18 team. In May 2026, he was named to the Canada U20 for the 2026 Maurice Revello Tournament.

== Personal life ==
Sedin is the son of Swedish former professional hockey player Henrik Sedin and the nephew of Daniel Sedin.

== Career statistics ==
As of July 1, 2024

Club	Season	League			Playoffs		Domestic Cup		Other		Total	
Club	Season	Division	Apps	Goals	Apps	Goals	Apps	Goals	Apps	Goals	Apps	Goals
Whitecaps FC Academy	2023	League1 British Columbia	1	0	0	0	–		–		1	0
Whitecaps FC 2	2024	MLS Next Pro	1	0	0	0	–		–		1	0
Career total			2	0	0	0	0	0	0	0	2	0
