= Dax Palmer =

Costa Rican footballer

Personal information
- Full name: Dax Alexander Palmer Zúñiga
- Date of birth: 8 February 2007 (age 19)
- Place of birth: Miami, Florida, United States
- Height: 1.90 m (6 ft 3 in)
- Position: Midfielder

Team information
- Current team: Júpiter Leonés (on loan from Alcorcón)

Youth career
- Herediano
- 2022–2023: Deportivo Saprissa

Senior career*
Years	Team	Apps	(Gls)
2023–2025	Deportivo Saprissa	11	(0)
2026–	Alcorcón	0	(0)
2026–	→ Júpiter Leonés (loan)	0	(0)

International career^{‡}
2025–	Costa Rica U20	7	(1)
2025–	Costa Rica U21	4	(1)
- * Club domestic league appearances and goals as of 6 December 2025 ‡ National team caps and goals as of 18 December 2025

Dax Alexander Palmer Zúñiga (born 8 February 2007) is a Costa Rican professional footballer who plays as a midfielder for Spanish Tercera Federación club Júpiter Leonés on loan from Alcorcón. Born in the United States, he has opted to play for the Costa Rica national team.

== Club career ==
Palmer was a youth product of Herediano, before moving to Deportivo Saprissa in 2022. On 26 November 2023 he debuted with Deportivo Saprissa in a 2–1 Liga FPD win over Santos de Guápiles. On 9 April 2025, he signed his first professional contract with Saprissa until 2028.

On 6 February 2026, Palmer joined Cultural Leonesa in the Spanish second tier on loan for their reserve team Júpiter Leonés.

== International career ==
Born in the United States to an American father and Costa Rican mother, Palmer moved to Costa Rica at a young age and holds dual-citizenship. He was due to get called up to Costa Rica national team in January for a friendly against the United States, but lacked a US visa and was unable to attend. He was on the preliminary 60-man squad list for the Costa Rica national team for the 2025 CONCACAF Gold Cup.

== Honours ==
- Liga FPD: 2023–24 Apertura, 2023–24 Clausura
