= Dino Klapija =

American soccer player (born 2007)

Personal information
- Date of birth: January 5, 2007 (age 19)
- Place of birth: North Hempstead, New York, U.S.
- Height: 5 ft 10 in (1.78 m)
- Position: Striker

Team information
- Current team: RB Leipzig Academy

Youth career
- –2022: New York City FC
- 2023: Dinamo Zagreb
- 2024–: RB Leipzig

Senior career*
Years	Team	Apps	(Gls)
2023–2024	Kustošija	9	(0)

International career^{‡}
2025	United States U18	4	(2)
2024	United States U19	2	(1)
2025–	United States U20	8	(4)
- * Club domestic league appearances and goals as of December 7, 2024 ‡ National team caps and goals as of 00:28, September 12, 2026 (UTC)

Dino Klapija (born January 5, 2007) is an American professional soccer player who is currently part of the academy of Bundesliga club RB Leipzig.

== Early and personal life ==
Born in New York, United States, Klapija is of Kosovan descent. Klapija moved with his family from the United States to Croatia in 2023.

== Career ==
Klapija holds dual American and Croatian citizenship, he played for the youth academy of Major League Soccer (MLS) side New York City FC, where he was described as "arguably the best player in his category".

== Style of play ==
Klapija has been described as a "great talent, an offensive midfielder, who can also play as a striker without any problems".
