= Mexico national under-20 football team =

National association football team

Mexico U-20
- Nickname: El Tri (The Tri)
- Association: Federación Mexicana de Fútbol
- Confederation: CONCACAF
- Head coach: Alex Diego
- Captain: Carlos Hernández
- Top scorer: José Juan Macías (11)
- FIFA code: MEX
| First colours | Second colours |

First international
- Mexico 5–0 Haiti (Panama City, Panama; March 9, 1962)

Biggest win
- Mexico 16–0 Puerto Rico (Rades, Tunisia; February 22, 1974)

Biggest defeat
- Costa Rica 5–1 Mexico (San Pedro, Honduras; August 21, 1994) Records for competitive matches only.

FIFA U-20 World Cup
- Appearances: 16 (first in 1977)
- Best result: Runners-up (1977)

CONCACAF Under-20 Championship
- Appearances: 29 (first in 1962)
- Best result: Champions (1962, 1970, 1973, 1974, 1976, 1978, 1980, 1984, 1990, 1992, 2011, 2013, 2015, 2024, 2026)

The Mexico national under-20 football team represents Mexico in association football at the under-20 age level, and is controlled by the Mexican Football Federation (FMF), the governing body of football in Mexico.

The team has won the CONCACAF Under-20 Championship a record thirteen times across its various formats. Mexico's best finish came at the 1977 FIFA World Youth Championship finishing as runners-up, the first edition of a FIFA-sanctioned youth tournament. They also managed a third-place finish at the 2011 edition.

== Results and fixtures ==
The following matches have been played within the past 12 months.

Win Draw Loss Fixture

=== 2026 ===
| 27 March Friendly | Mexico | 1–0 | Costa Rica | Toluca, Mexico |
| 10:00 UTC–6 | Sigala 2' | Report | | Stadium: Instalaciones de la Federación Mexicana de Futbol |

| 30 March Friendly | Mexico | 1–0 | Costa Rica | Toluca, Mexico |
| 10:00 UTC–6 | Sigala 83' | Report | | Stadium: Instalaciones de la Federación Mexicana de Futbol |

| 5 June 2026 Revelations Cup | Mexico | 1–3 | Japan | Boca del Rio, Mexico |
| 21:00 UTC–6 | Camberos 75' | Report | Chinedu 23'; Himeno 40'; Yamamoto 45+2' | Stadium: Estadio Luis "Pirata" Fuente |

| 8 June 2026 Revelations Cup | Piratas (Mexico) | 0–0 | Mexico | Boca del Rio, Mexico |
| 20:30 UTC–6 | | Report | | Stadium: Estadio Luis "Pirata" Fuente |

| 24 July 2026 CONCACAF U-20 Championship GS | Mexico | 3–0 | Antigua and Barbuda | Puebla, Mexico |
| 17:00 UTC–6 | Camberos 12' (pen.); Valenzuela 22'; Sandoval 45+2' | Report | | Stadium: Estadio Cuauhtémoc; Referee: Jorge Leira (Panama) |

| 27 July 2026 CONCACAF U-20 Championship GS | Costa Rica | 0–2 | Mexico | Puebla, Mexico |
| 20:00 UTC–6 | | Report | Camberos 42' (pen.); Brenes 59' (o.g.) | Stadium: Estadio Cuauhtémoc; Referee: Guido Gonzales Jr. (United States) |

| 30 July 2026 CONCACAF U-20 Championship GS | Mexico | 4–0 | Guatemala | Puebla, Mexico |
| 19:00 UTC–6 | Ramírez 45'; Camberos 54'; Gamboa 65'; Cedillo 89' | Report | | Stadium: Estadio Cuauhtémoc; Referee: Michael Venne (Canada) |

| 5 August 2026 CONCACAF U-20 Championship QF | Mexico | 4–0 | Panama | Puebla, Mexico |
| 20:00 UTC–6 | Echilvestre 34'; Camberos 57'; Orozco 75'; Ramírez 88' | Report | | Stadium: Estadio Cuauhtémoc; Referee: Michael Venne (Canada) |

| 7 August 2026 CONCACAF U-20 Championship SF | Canada | 1–2 | Mexico | Mexico City, Mexico |
| 21:00 UTC–6 | Graham-Roache 6' | Report | Alfaro 49'; Camberos 78' (pen.) | Stadium: Estadio Azteca; Referee: Cristhofer Corado (Guatemala) |
Note: Originally scheduled for 20:00, but was delayed to 21:00 due to adverse weather conditions.

| 9 August 2026 CONCACAF U-20 Championship F | United States | 0–2 | Mexico | Mexico City, Mexico |
| 17:00 UTC–6 | | Report | Alfaro 28', 69' | Stadium: Estadio Azteca; Referee: Adonis Carrasco (Dominican Republic) |

| 30 September Friendly | Spain | 2–0 | Mexico | Majadahonda, Spain |
| 20:30 UTC+2 | Pitarch 45+1'; Morante 71' | Report | | Stadium: Estadio Cerro del Espino; Attendance: 36,000; Referee: Álvaro Rodríguez Recio |

| 2 October Unoffical Friendly | Mexico | 2–3 | (Spain) Elche | San Pedro del Pinatar, Spain |
| 10:00 UTC+2 | de Nigris 25'; Hernández 44' | Report | Ponce (pen.); Ponce; Osorio | Stadium: Pinatar Arena; Attendance: 0 (behind closed doors) |

| 4 October Friendly | Brazil | 4–0 | Mexico | San Pedro del Pinatar, Spain |
| 11:00 UTC+2 | Heittor 49'; Bruninho 52'; Meirelles 72'; Ananias 80' | Report | | Stadium: Pinatar Arena; Referee: José David Martínez Montalvan |

| 13 November Friendly | Chile | 1–1 | Mexico | Santiago, Chile |
| 15:00 UTC-3 | Flores 67' | Report | García 65' | Stadium: Centro de Alto Rendimiento |

| 16 November Friendly | Chile | 2–2 | Mexico | Santiago, Chile |
| 15:00 UTC-3 | Coulombe 4'; Riquelme 4' | Report | Cárdenas 39'; Jiménez 41' | Stadium: Centro de Alto Rendimiento |

== Players ==
=== Current squad ===
The following 22 players were called up for the Friendlies in Spain.

| No. | Pos. | Player | Date of birth (age) | Club |
|---|---|---|---|---|
| | GK | Sebastián Liceaga | 11 April 2007 (age 19) | (Mexican Football Federation) Guadalajara |
| | GK | Artemio Olvera | 28 April 2007 (age 19) | (Mexican Football Federation) Atlético San Luis |
| | DF | Cristóbal Alfaro | 23 May 2007 (age 19) | (Mexican Football Federation) Atlante |
| | DF | Ricardo Alonso | 15 April 2007 (age 19) | (Mexican Football Federation) Tepatitlán |
| | DF | Luis Carmona | 17 January 2007 (age 19) | (Mexican Football Federation) Juárez |
| | DF | Juan Echilvestre | 7 April 2007 (age 19) | (Mexican Football Federation) Santos Laguna |
| | DF | Carlos Hernández (Captain) | 1 April 2007 (age 19) | (Mexican Football Federation) Tapatío |
| | DF | Ian Olvera | 15 June 2008 (age 18) | (Mexican Football Federation) Tijuana |
| | DF | Yohan Orozco | 11 March 2007 (age 19) | (Mexican Football Federation) Guadalajara |
| | DF | Edwin Soto | 29 January 2007 (age 19) | (Mexican Football Federation) Pachuca |
| | MF | Nelson Cedillo | 21 March 2007 (age 19) | (Mexican Football Federation) Santos Laguna |
| | MF | Diego Covarrubias | 8 February 2007 (age 19) | (Mexican Football Federation) Guadalajara |
| | MF | Gael García | 4 June 2008 (age 18) | (Mexican Football Federation) Tapatío |
| | MF | Luis Gómez | 2 January 2007 (age 19) | (Mexican Football Federation) Santos Laguna |
| | MF | Cristóbal Hernández | 1 September 2007 (age 19) | (Mexican Football Federation) Pachuca |
| | MF | Samir Inda | 7 October 2007 (age 19) | (Mexican Football Federation) Tapatío |
| | MF | Juan Sigala | 6 April 2007 (age 19) | (Mexican Football Federation) Juárez |
| | MF | Henrique Simeone | 12 June 2007 (age 19) | (Mexican Football Federation) UANL |
| | FW | Willian Gabriel | 19 December 2007 (age 18) | (United States Soccer Federation) North Texas SC |
| | FW | Aldo de Nigris | 12 April 2008 (age 18) | (Mexican Football Federation) Monterrey |
| | FW | Diego Reyes | 3 September 2007 (age 19) | (Brazilian Football Confederation) Flamengo |
| | FW | Aldahir Valenzuela | 13 April 2007 (age 19) | (Mexican Football Federation) Monterrey |

=== Recent call-ups ===
The following players have also been called up within the last twelve months.

| Pos. | Player | Date of birth (age) | Caps | Goals | Club | Latest call-up |
|---|---|---|---|---|---|---|
| GK | Cristo Navarrete | 14 January 2007 (age 19) | 5 | 0 | (Mexico) Guadalajara | 2026 CONCACAF U-20 Championship |
| GK | Rodrigo Parra | 28 November 2007 (age 18) | 0 | 0 | (Mexico) UNAM | 2026 Revelations Cup |
| DF | Diego García | 10 March 2007 (age 19) | 0 | 0 | (Mexico) Monterrey | 2026 Revelations Cup |
| DF | Diego Chavira | 17 March 2007 (age 19) | 0 | 0 | (Mexico) Monterrey | v. Costa Rica, 30 March 2026 |
| DF | Miguel Nuño | 25 September 2008 (age 18) | 0 | 0 | (Mexico) UdeG | v. Costa Rica, 30 March 2026 |
| DF | Anthony Bautista | 2 June 2007 (age 19) | 0 | 0 | (Mexico) Atlas | January 2026 training camp |
| DF | Mahonry Cárdenas | 26 January 2007 (age 19) | 0 | 0 | (Mexico) Monterrey | January 2026 training camp |
| DF | Emiliano Villaseñor | 9 November 2007 (age 19) | 0 | 0 | (Mexico) UNAM | January 2026 training camp |
| MF | Santiago Sandoval | 7 August 2007 (age 19) | 4 | 1 | (Mexico) Guadalajara | 2026 CONCACAF U-20 Championship |
| MF | Joshua Palacios | 1 January 2007 (age 19) | 0 | 0 | (Mexico) Necaxa | 2026 Revelations Cup |
| MF | Sebastián Rodríguez | 13 September 2007 (age 19) | 0 | 0 | (Mexico) Monterrey | 2026 Revelations Cup |
| MF | Jeremy Sepúlveda | 20 May 2007 (age 19) | 0 | 0 | (Mexico) Pachuca | v. Costa Rica, 30 March 2026 |
| MF | Neo Lima Stacziwa | 7 December 2007 (age 18) | 0 | 0 | (Germany) SC Paderborn | v. Costa Rica, 30 March 2026 |
| MF | Derek Jiménez | 27 May 2007 (age 19) | 0 | 0 | (Mexico) América | January 2026 training camp |
| FW | Hugo Camberos | 21 January 2007 (age 19) | 8 | 4 | (Mexico) Guadalajara | 2026 CONCACAF U-20 Championship |
| FW | Luis Gamboa | 25 October 2008 (age 18) | 6 | 1 | (Mexico) Atlas | 2026 CONCACAF U-20 Championship |
| FW | Diego Ramírez | 15 January 2007 (age 19) | 5 | 2 | (Mexico) UANL | 2026 CONCACAF U-20 Championship |
| FW | Jonatan Ramírez | 8 January 2007 (age 19) | 0 | 0 | (Mexico) Pachuca | 2026 Revelations Cup |
| FW | José Martín | 19 May 2007 (age 19) | 0 | 0 | (Mexico) Atlas | v. Costa Rica, 30 March 2026 |
| FW | Santiago López | 28 January 2007 (age 19) | 0 | 0 | (Mexico) Pachuca | January 2026 training camp |

== Player records ==
=== Top goalscorers ===
Players in bold are still active with Mexico. Includes only statistics recognized by FIFA.

| Rank | Player | Year(s) | U-20 Goals |
|---|---|---|---|
| 1 | José Juan Macías | 2018–2019 | 11 |
| 2 | Ronaldo Cisneros | 2017 | 8 |
| 3 | **Tahiel Jiménez** | 2024–present | 6 |
| 3 | Hirving Lozano | 2015 | 6 |
| 4 | Ulises Dávila | 2011 | 5 |
| 4 | Giovani dos Santos | 2007 | 5 |
| 4 | Esteban Lozano | 2022 | 5 |

== Managers ==
| Name | Years |
|---|---|
| (Mexico) Horacio Casarín | 1977 |
| (Mexico) Mario Velarde | 1983 |
| (Mexico) Jesús del Muro | 1985, 1998–1999 |
| (Mexico) Alfonso Portugal | 1991 |
| (Mexico) Juan de Dios Castillo | 1992–1993 |
| (Mexico) Juan Manuel Alvarez | 1994 |
| (Mexico) José Luis Real | 1996–1997, 2001 |
| (Mexico) Eduardo Rergis | 2002–2003 |
| (Argentina) Humberto Grondona | 2005 |
| (Mexico) Jesús Ramírez | 2007–2009 |
| (Mexico) Juan Carlos Chávez | 2009–2011 |
| (Mexico) Sergio Almaguer | 2013–2015 |
| (Mexico) Marco Antonio Ruiz | 2016–2020 |
| (Mexico) Raúl Chabrand | 2020–2021 |
| (Mexico) Luis Ernesto Pérez | 2021–2022 |
| (Mexico) Adrián Sánchez | 2022–2023 |
| (Mexico) Eduardo Arce | 2023–2025 |
| (Mexico) Alex Diego | 2026–present |

== Competitive record ==
=== FIFA U-20 World Cup ===
| Year | Round | Position | Pld | W | D* | L | GF | GA |
|---|---|---|---|---|---|---|---|---|
| (Tunisia) 1977 | **Runners-up** | **2nd** | **5** | **1** | **4** | **0** | **11** | **5** |
| (Japan) 1979 | Group stage | 11th | 3 | 0 | 2 | 1 | 3 | 4 |
| (Australia) 1981 | Group stage | 11th | 3 | 0 | 2 | 1 | 4 | 5 |
| (Mexico) 1983 | Group stage | 13th | 3 | 0 | 1 | 2 | 2 | 4 |
| (Soviet Union) 1985 | Quarter-finals | 5th | 4 | 3 | 0 | 1 | 7 | 3 |
| (Chile) 1987 | Did not qualify | | | | | | | |
| (Saudi Arabia) 1989 | Banned | | | | | | | |
| (Portugal) 1991 | Quarter-finals | 7th | 4 | 1 | 2 | 1 | 7 | 5 |
| (Australia) 1993 | Quarter-finals | 5th | 4 | 2 | 1 | 1 | 6 | 3 |
| (Qatar) 1995 | Did not qualify | | | | | | | |
| (Malaysia) 1997 | Round of 16 | 12th | 4 | 1 | 1 | 2 | 6 | 3 |
| (Nigeria) 1999 | Quarter-finals | 6th | 5 | 3 | 1 | 1 | 9 | 5 |
| (Argentina) 2001 | Did not qualify | | | | | | | |
| (United Arab Emirates) 2003 | Group stage | 22nd | 3 | 0 | 1 | 2 | 2 | 5 |
| (Netherlands) 2005 | Did not qualify | | | | | | | |
| (Canada) 2007 | Quarter-finals | 5th | 5 | 4 | 0 | 1 | 10 | 3 |
| (Egypt) 2009 | Did not qualify | | | | | | | |
| (Colombia) 2011 | **Third place** | **3rd** | **7** | **3** | **2** | **2** | **10** | **6** |
| (Turkey) 2013 | Round of 16 | 16th | 4 | 1 | 0 | 3 | 6 | 6 |
| (New Zealand) 2015 | Group stage | 17th | 3 | 1 | 0 | 2 | 2 | 5 |
| (South Korea) 2017 | Quarter-finals | 8th | 5 | 2 | 1 | 2 | 4 | 4 |
| (Poland) 2019 | Group stage | 21st | 3 | 0 | 0 | 3 | 1 | 6 |
| (Argentina) 2023 | Did not qualify | | | | | | | |
| (Chile) 2025 | Quarter-finals | 6th | 5 | 2 | 2 | 1 | 9 | 7 |
| (Azerbaijan) (Uzbekistan) 2027 | Qualified | | | | | | | |
| (Armenia) (Georgia (country)) 2029 | To be determined | | | | | | | |
| **Total** | 17/25 | | 70 | 24 | 20 | 26 | 99 | 79 |

=== CONCACAF U-20 Championship ===
CONCACAF U-20 Championship record
| Year | Result | Position | Pld | W | D | L | GF | GA |
|---|---|---|---|---|---|---|---|---|
| (Panama) 1962 | **Champions** | **1st of 9** | **7** | **4** | **3** | **0** | **19** | **5** |
| (Guatemala) 1964 | Group stage | 5th of 9 | 3 | 1 | 1 | 1 | 3 | 2 |
| (Cuba) 1970 | **Champions** | **1st of 5** | **4** | **3** | **1** | **0** | **13** | **2** |
| (Mexico) 1973 | **Champions** | **1st of 6** | **4** | **4** | **0** | **0** | **12** | **1** |
| (Canada) 1974 | **Champions** | **1st of 12** | **5** | **4** | **1** | **0** | **21** | **0** |
| (Puerto Rico) 1976 | **Champions** | **1st of 15** | **8** | **7** | **1** | **0** | **33** | **3** |
| (Honduras) 1978 | **Champions** | **1st of 13** | **8** | **7** | **0** | **1** | **22** | **4** |
| (United States) 1980 | **Champions** | **1st of 18** | **6** | **4** | **2** | **0** | **12** | **2** |
| (Guatemala) 1982 | Did not enter | | | | | | | |
| (Trinidad and Tobago) 1984 | **Champions** | **1st of 16** | **8** | **7** | **1** | **0** | **19** | **3** |
| (Trinidad and Tobago) 1986 | Group stage | 5th of 10 | 4 | 2 | 1 | 1 | 4 | 4 |
| (Guatemala) 1988 | **Runners-up** | **2nd of 10** | **7** | **6** | **0** | **1** | **19** | **6** |
| (Guatemala) 1990 | **Champions** | **1st of 12** | **5** | **5** | **0** | **0** | **17** | **2** |
| (Canada) 1992 | **Champions** | **1st of 11** | **6** | **3** | **3** | **0** | **11** | **2** |
| (Honduras) 1994 | Group stage | 6th of 12 | 3 | 2 | 0 | 1 | 8 | 6 |
| (Mexico) 1996 | **Runners-up** | **2nd of 12** | **5** | **4** | **1** | **0** | **11** | **3** |
| (Guatemala) (Trinidad and Tobago) 1998 | 1st, Group A | | 3 | 3 | 0 | 0 | 9 | 2 |
| (Canada) (Trinidad and Tobago) 2001 | 3rd, Group B | | 3 | 1 | 1 | 1 | 3 | 2 |
| (Panama) (United States) 2003 | 2nd, Group A | | 3 | 2 | 0 | 1 | 7 | 3 |
| (United States) (Honduras) 2005 | 3rd, Group A | | 3 | 1 | 0 | 2 | 2 | 4 |
| (Panama) (Mexico) 2007 | 1st, Group B | | 3 | 2 | 1 | 0 | 5 | 1 |
| (Trinidad and Tobago) 2009 | Group stage | 8th of 8 | 3 | 0 | 1 | 2 | 2 | 5 |
| (Guatemala) 2011 | **Champions** | **1st of 12** | **4** | **4** | **0** | **0** | **14** | **1** |
| (Mexico) 2013 | **Champions** | **1st of 12** | **5** | **5** | **0** | **0** | **15** | **1** |
| (Jamaica) 2015 | **Champions** | **1st of 12** | **6** | **4** | **2** | **0** | **19** | **4** |
| (Costa Rica) 2017 | **Classification stage** | **3rd of 12** | **5** | **4** | **0** | **1** | **15** | **2** |
| (United States) 2018 | **Runners-up** | **2nd of 34** | **8** | **5** | **2** | **1** | **34** | **6** |
| (Honduras) 2020 | Cancelled | | | | | | | |
| (Honduras) 2022 | Quarter-finals | 5th of 20 | 5 | 3 | 2 | 0 | 20 | 1 |
| (Mexico) 2024 | **Champions** | **1st of 12** | **6** | **5** | **1** | **0** | **13** | **4** |
| (Mexico) 2026 | **Champions** | **1st of 12** | **6** | **6** | **0** | **0** | **17** | **1** |
| **Total** | **15 Titles** | **28/29** | **146** | **108** | **25** | **13** | **399** | **82** |

== Head-to-head record ==
The following table shows Mexico's head-to-head record in the FIFA U-20 World Cup.

| Opponent | Pld | W | D | L | GF | GA | GD | Win % |
|---|---|---|---|---|---|---|---|---|
| Algeria | 1 | 0 | 1 | 0 | 1 | 1 | +0 | 0.00 |
| Argentina | 4 | 1 | 0 | 3 | 4 | 5 | −1 | 25.00 |
| Australia | 2 | 1 | 1 | 0 | 4 | 2 | +2 | 50.00 |
| Brazil | 5 | 0 | 3 | 2 | 6 | 9 | −3 | 0.00 |
| Cameroon | 1 | 0 | 1 | 0 | 1 | 1 | +0 | 0.00 |
| Chile | 1 | 1 | 0 | 0 | 4 | 1 | +3 | 100.00 |
| China | 1 | 1 | 0 | 0 | 3 | 1 | +2 | 100.00 |
| Colombia | 1 | 1 | 0 | 0 | 3 | 1 | +2 | 100.00 |
| Congo | 1 | 1 | 0 | 0 | 3 | 0 | +3 | 100.00 |
| Ecuador | 1 | 0 | 0 | 1 | 0 | 1 | −1 | 0.00 |
| Egypt | 1 | 0 | 1 | 0 | 3 | 3 | +0 | 0.00 |
| England | 5 | 1 | 2 | 2 | 1 | 2 | −1 | 20.00 |
| France | 3 | 1 | 1 | 1 | 4 | 3 | +1 | 33.33 |
| Gambia | 1 | 1 | 0 | 0 | 3 | 0 | +3 | 100.00 |
| Germany | 1 | 0 | 1 | 0 | 0 | 0 | +0 | 0.00 |
| Greece | 1 | 0 | 0 | 1 | 1 | 2 | −1 | 0.00 |
| Italy | 1 | 0 | 0 | 1 | 1 | 2 | −1 | 0.00 |
| Ivory Coast | 3 | 0 | 2 | 1 | 3 | 4 | −1 | 0.00 |
| Japan | 3 | 0 | 1 | 2 | 1 | 6 | −5 | 0.00 |
| Mali | 2 | 1 | 0 | 1 | 4 | 3 | +1 | 50.00 |
| Morocco | 1 | 1 | 0 | 0 | 1 | 0 | +1 | 100.00 |
| New Zealand | 1 | 1 | 0 | 0 | 2 | 1 | +1 | 100.00 |
| Nigeria | 1 | 0 | 0 | 1 | 1 | 2 | −1 | 0.00 |
| Norway | 1 | 1 | 0 | 0 | 3 | 0 | +3 | 100.00 |
| North Korea | 1 | 1 | 0 | 0 | 3 | 0 | +3 | 100.00 |
| Paraguay | 2 | 1 | 0 | 1 | 2 | 1 | +1 | 50.00 |
| Portugal | 2 | 1 | 0 | 1 | 3 | 3 | +0 | 50.00 |
| Republic of Ireland | 2 | 1 | 0 | 1 | 1 | 2 | −1 | 50.00 |
| Saudi Arabia | 3 | 1 | 2 | 0 | 4 | 3 | +1 | 33.33 |
| Scotland | 1 | 0 | 0 | 1 | 0 | 1 | −1 | 0.00 |
| Senegal | 1 | 1 | 0 | 0 | 1 | 0 | +1 | 100.00 |
| Serbia | 1 | 0 | 0 | 1 | 0 | 2 | −2 | 0.00 |
| South Korea | 1 | 0 | 0 | 1 | 1 | 2 | −1 | 0.00 |
| Soviet Union | 1 | 0 | 1 | 0 | 2 | 2 | +0 | 0.00 |
| Spain | 5 | 0 | 3 | 2 | 6 | 8 | −2 | 0.00 |
| Sweden | 1 | 1 | 0 | 0 | 3 | 0 | +3 | 100.00 |
| Tunisia | 1 | 1 | 0 | 0 | 6 | 0 | +6 | 100.00 |
| United Arab Emirates | 1 | 1 | 0 | 0 | 5 | 0 | +5 | 100.00 |
| Uruguay | 1 | 1 | 0 | 0 | 2 | 1 | +1 | 100.00 |
| Vanuatu | 1 | 1 | 0 | 0 | 3 | 2 | +1 | 100.00 |
| Venezuela | 1 | 0 | 0 | 1 | 0 | 1 | −1 | 0.00 |
| West Germany | 1 | 0 | 0 | 1 | 0 | 1 | −1 | 0.00 |
| Total | **70** | **24** | **20** | **26** | **99** | **79** | **+20** | **34.29** |

== Honours ==
Major competitions

- **FIFA U-20 World Cup**
  - Runners-up (1): 1977
  - Third Place (1): 2011
- **CONCACAF Under-20 Championship**
  - Winners (15): 1962, 1970, 1973, 1974, 1976, 1978, 1980, 1984, 1990, 1992, 2011, 2013, 2015, 2024, 2026
  - Runners-up (3): 1988, 1996, 2018

Other competitions

- **Pan American Games**
  - Bronze medalists (1): 2007
- **Revelations Cup**
  - Winners (2): 2021, 2022
- **Central American and Caribbean Games**
  - Gold medalists (1): 2014
  - Silver medalists (3): 1993, 1998, 2002
- **Copa Presidente de la República**
  - Winners (1): 2011
- **Beijing Hyundai International Youth Football Tournament**
  - Runner-up (1): 2012
- **Milk Cup**
  - Winners (3): 2001, 2012, 2013
- **Lev Yashin Cup**
  - Winners (1): 2012
- **ADO Den Haag Tournament**
  - Winners (1): 59th ADO Den Haag Tournament

=== Individual awards ===
- **FIFA U-20 World Cup**

| Year | Golden Ball | Silver Ball | Bronze Ball |
|---|---|---|---|
| 2007 | | | Giovani dos Santos |
| 2011 | | | Jorge Enríquez |

| Year | Golden Shoe | Silver Shoe | Bronze Shoe |
|---|---|---|---|
| 1977 | | | Luis Placencia |

== See also ==
- Mexico national football team
- Mexico national under-23 football team
- Mexico national under-17 football team
- Mexico women's national football team
- Mexico national beach football team
- Mexico national futsal team
