= Liam Mackenzie =

Canadian soccer player (born 2007)

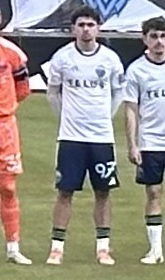
- Mackenzie in 2026

Personal information
- Date of birth: March 15, 2007 (age 19)
- Place of birth: Comox, British Columbia, Canada
- Height: 1.80 m (5 ft 11 in)
- Position: Midfielder

Team information
- Current team: HFX Wanderers FC

Youth career
- Comox Valley United SC
- Vancouver Island Wave
- 2020–2024: Vancouver Whitecaps FC

Senior career*
| Years | Team | Apps | (Gls) |
| 2023–2025 | Whitecaps FC 2 | 24 | (2) |
| 2025 | → Vancouver Whitecaps FC (loan) | 1 | (0) |
| 2025– | Vancouver Whitecaps FC | 0 | (0) |
| 2025–2026 | → Whitecaps FC 2 (loan) | 10 | (5) |
| 2026– | → HFX Wanderers (loan) | 7 | (1) |

International career^{‡}
| 2022–2023 | Canada U17 | 7 | (2) |
| 2025 | Canada U18 | 2 | (0) |
| 2026– | Canada U20 | 13 | (5) |
- * Club domestic league appearances and goals as of October 24, 2026 ‡ National team caps and goals as of August 8, 2026

Liam Mackenzie (born March 15, 2007) is a Canadian soccer player who plays as a midfielder for Major League Soccer club Vancouver Whitecaps FC.

== Early life ==
Mackenzie began playing youth soccer at age four with Comox Valley United SC. He later played youth soccer with the Vancouver Island Wave, before joining the Vancouver Whitecaps FC Academy in August 2020. He captained both the U15 and U17 academy teams and won the academy's 2022 U15 Player of the Year award and Academy Best XI, and the 2023 U-17 Student Athlete award and Cornerstone award. In July 2024, he was named to the MLS Next All-Star Game.

== Club career ==
On September 9, 2023, Mackenzie debuted with Whitecaps FC 2 in MLS Next Pro, on an academy player contract. In April 2024, he signed a professional contract with the team through the 2026 season. In July 2024, he signed a short-term loan with the Vancouver Whitecaps FC first team, ahead of a friendly against Welsh club Wrexham. On September 21, 2024, he scored his first professional goal in a 3-1 victory over the Tacoma Defiance. In March 2025, he signed two short-term loans with the first team. On March 22, 2025, he made his Major League Soccer debut, starting against Chicago Fire FC. On August 19, 2025, he signed a Homegrown Player contract with the Whitecaps' first team through the 2028 season, with a club option for 2029.

=== Loan to HFX Wanderers FC ===
On September 2, 2026, Mackenzie joined Canadian Premier League club HFX Wanderers on loan until the end of the 2026 season.

== International career ==
Mackenzie made his debut in the Canada national program, attending a camp with the Canada U17 in October 2022. In December 2022, he was named to the team for a camp in Mexico where they played a pair of friendlies, scoring in the first match against Costa Rica U17. He was subsequently named to the team for the 2017 CONCACAF U-17 Championship and was selected as an alternate for the 2017 FIFA U-17 World Cup.

In August 2025, he was called up to the Canada U18 team for a series of friendlies.

== Career statistics ==
As of April 2, 2025

Appearances and goals by club, season and competition
| Club | Season | League | | | Playoffs | | National cup | | Continental | | Total | |
| Club | Season | Division | Apps | Goals | Apps | Goals | Apps | Goals | Apps | Goals | Apps | Goals |
|---|---|---|---|---|---|---|---|---|---|---|---|---|
| Whitecaps FC 2 | 2023 | MLS Next Pro | 1 | 0 | – | | – | | – | | 1 | 0 |
| Whitecaps FC 2 | 2024 | MLS Next Pro | 22 | 1 | 1 | 0 | – | | – | | 23 | 1 |
| Whitecaps FC 2 | 2025 | MLS Next Pro | 1 | 1 | – | | – | | – | | 1 | 1 |
| Whitecaps FC 2 | Total | | 24 | 2 | 1 | 0 | 0 | 0 | 0 | 0 | 25 | 2 |
| Vancouver Whitecaps FC (loan) | 2025 | Major League Soccer | 1 | 0 | 0 | 0 | 0 | 0 | 0 | 0 | 1 | 0 |
| Career total | | | 25 | 2 | 1 | 0 | 0 | 0 | 0 | 0 | 26 | 2 |
