= Mexico national under-18 football team =

National U-18 association football team

Mexico U-18
- Nickname: El Tricolor (The Tricolor)
- Association: Mexican Football Federation (Federación Mexicana de Fútbol)
- Confederation: CONCACAF (North America)
- Head coach: Vacant
- FIFA code: MEX
First colours	Second colours

The Mexico national under-18 football team, is controlled by the Federación Mexicana de Fútbol Asociación (Mexican Football Federation) and represents Mexico in international under-18 (under age 18) football competitions.

The Mexico national Under-18 football team serves as a transition for players between the Mexico national under-17 football team and the Mexico national under-20 football team.

Though the team does not compete in a World Cups, It competes in international tournaments and holds several domestic training camps throughout the year.

== See also ==
- Mexico national football team
- Mexico national under-15 football team
- Mexico national under-17 football team
- Mexico national under-20 football team
- Mexico national under-21 football team
- Mexico national under-23 football team
- Mexico national beach football team
- Mexico national futsal team
