= Alex Diego (footballer, born 1985) =

Mexican footballer and manager (born 1985)

Personal information
- Full name: Alejandro Diego Tejado
- Date of birth: 1 July 1985 (age 41)
- Place of birth: Mexico City, Mexico
- Height: 1.80 m (5 ft 11 in)
- Positions: Midfielder; defender

Team information
- Current team: Mexico U20 (manager)

Senior career*
Years	Team	Apps	(Gls)
2005–2010	Pumas UNAM	29	(0)
2006	→ Chiapas (loan)	6	(0)
2010–2013	Atlante	38	(1)
2012–2013	→ Lobos BUAP (loan)	27	(2)
2014	→ Delfines (loan)	0	(0)
2014–2016	Alebrijes de Oaxaca	26	(1)

Managerial career
- 2018: Pumas UNAM Reserves and Academy
- 2018: Pumas UNAM Premier (Assistant)
- 2018–2019: Alebrijes de Oaxaca
- 2019–2020: Atlante
- 2020: Querétaro
- 2023: Necaxa (assistant)
- 2023–2025: Mexico U18
- 2025–: Mexico U20
- * Club domestic league appearances and goals

Alex Diego Tejado (born 1 July 1985) is a Mexican professional football coach and a former player who is currently the manager of the Mexico national under-20 team.

== Playing career ==
Diego joined the Pumas youth system at age 14 and worked his way through the ranks, made the first division team with Pumas when Hugo Sánchez commanded it. He was also a player and captain of the U-20 Mexican team in 2006, but an injury delayed his national team dream. He then played under Miguel España's leadership. In 2006 Diego was loaned to Chiapas, making his first-division debut with them. Then he returned to Pumas where worked hard to get a position, under Tuca Ferretti's leading. A highlight of his career was a goal from about 40 yards out against Tijuana; this was not only the game-winning goal, but a goal that opened doors for the young Mexican. In 2010 Diego was loaned by Pumas to Atlante and in June 2011 is officially transferred. A fast and strong player, he can play right-footed as well as a lefty. He has good field vision to penetrate with long passes. Diego retired from professional football at the age of 31 in 2017, and has since taken a managerial role.

== Coaching career ==
He went back to his youth team and coached the Pumas UNAM Under-15 team for 2 years. After a promising track record with the youth teams, he took control of the Pumas Morelos squad in the Mexican Segunda Division. Moving up again, Diego made his way into the Ascenso MX to manage his recently former club, Alebrijes de Oaxaca.

== Honours ==
=== Player ===
Pumas UNAM

- Mexican Primera División: Clausura 2009

=== Manager ===
Mexico U20

- CONCACAF Under-20 Championship: 2026
