= Ramírez (surname) =

- Coat of arms of one Ramirez family
- Pronunciation: Spanish: [raˈmiɾeθ] in Latin America: [raˈmiɾes]
- Language: Spanish

Origin
- Meaning: "son of Ramiro"
- Region of origin: Castile

Ramírez is a Spanish-language patronymic surname of Germanic origin, meaning "son of Ramiro". Its correct spelling in Spanish is with an acute accent on the i, which is often omitted in English writing. It is the 28th most common surname in Spain. It is also the 42nd most common surname in the U.S. and the 9th most common in Mexico.

== Geographical distribution ==
As of 2014, 40.1% of all known bearers of the surname Ramírez were residents of Mexico (frequency 1:62), 10.2% of Colombia (1:95), 8.3% of the United States (1:874), 5.4% of Venezuela (1:112), 5.3% of Guatemala (1:61), 4.3% of Peru (1:149), 3.6% of Argentina (1:239), 2.8% of Spain (1:336), 2.7% of the Philippines (1:768), 2.6% of the Dominican Republic (1:79), 2.1% of Chile (1:169), 2.0% of El Salvador (1:65), 1.9% of Cuba (1:123), 1.7% of Honduras (1:105), 1.7% of Paraguay (1:88), 1.3% of Costa Rica (1:72) and 1.2% of Ecuador (1:273).

In Spain, the frequency of the surname was higher than average (1:336) in the following regions:

1. Canary Islands (1:149)
2. Andalusia (1:179)
3. La Rioja (1:264)
4. Castilla–La Mancha (1:276)
5. Ceuta (1:295)
6. Community of Madrid (1:336)

In Guatemala, the frequency of the surname was higher than average (1:61) in the following departments:

1. Chiquimula (1:15)
2. San Marcos (1:22)
3. Zacapa (1:26)
4. Izabal (1:35)
5. Esquintla (1:40)
6. El Progreso (1:40)
7. Quetzaltenango (1:43)
8. Jutiapa (1:50)
9. Retalhuleu (1:51)
10. Santa Rosa (1:54)
11. Petén (1:58)

In Mexico, the frequency of the surname was higher than national average (1:62) in the following states:

1. Guanajuato (1:32)
2. Oaxaca (1:43)
3. Querétaro (1:49)
4. Colima (1:54)
5. Jalisco (1:55)
6. Hidalgo (1:56)
7. Coahuila (1:58)
8. State of Mexico (1:60)
9. Mexico City (1:60)
10. Aguascalientes (1:61)

== People ==
- Agustín Ramírez (disambiguation), multiple people
- Ainissa Ramirez (born 1969), American materials scientist and science communicator
- Albertina Ramírez (1898–1979), Nicaraguan Roman Catholic mystic and religious leader
- Alex Ramírez (born 1974), left fielder for the Yokohama DeNA BayStars
- Alexei Ramírez (born 1981), Cuban baseball player
- Ana María Ramírez (born 1948), Peruvian volleyball player
- Angel Ramirez (politician), American politician
- Ángel de Saavedra y Ramírez de Baquedano, 3rd Duke of Rivas (1791–1865), Spanish poet and politician
- Anna Ramírez (beach volleyball) (born 1984), Guatemalan athlete
- Antonia Ramírez (died 2024), Salvadoran singer and language activist
- Aramis Ramírez (born 1978), third-baseman for the Pittsburgh Pirates
- Ariel Ramírez (1921–2010), Argentinian composer and pianist
- Brandon Ramírez (born 2008), Salvadoran footballer
- Carlos Ramírez (born 1991), Dominican baseball player
- Carlos Ramírez Suárez (1902–1978), Spanish lawyer and writer
- Carlos Betances Ramírez (1910–2001), Puerto Rican Army Colonel
- Cecil Ramirez (died 2000), Belizean inmate
- Chamaco Ramirez (1941–1983), Puerto Rican salsa singer and composer
- Cierra Ramirez (born 1995), American actress
- Cristian Ramírez (born 1994), Ecuadorian football player
- Cuauhtémoc Sandoval Ramírez (1950–2012), Mexican politician
- Dania Ramírez (born 1979), Dominican actress
- Daniel Ramírez Romero (born 1995), Spanish singer
- Danny Ramirez (born 1992), American actor
- Danny Ramirez (baseball), American baseball player and coach
- David Noel Ramírez Padilla (1950–2025), Mexican academic administrator
- Diana Velázquez Ramírez (born 1970), Mexican politician
- Dubán Ramírez (born 1965), Colombian road cyclist
- Édgar Ramirez Arellano (born 1987), Venezuelan actor
- Edwar Ramírez (born 1981), relief pitcher for the New York Yankees
- Efren Ramírez (born 1973), American actor
- Emma Ramírez (born 2002), Spanish footballer
- Emmanuel Ramírez (born 1994), Dominican baseball player
- Erasmo Ramirez (left-handed pitcher) (born 1976), American baseball player
- Erasmo Ramírez (right-handed pitcher) (born 1990), Nicaraguan baseball player
- Erwin Ramírez (born 1971), Ecuadorian football player
- Fabiola Ramírez (born 1990), Mexican Paralympic swimmer
- Fernando Ramírez de Haro, 16th Count of Bornos (born 1949)
- Fernando Ramírez de Haro, 10th Marquis of Villanueva del Duero (born 1976)
- García Ramírez of Navarre (1112–1150), of the Jiménez dynasty
- Gastón Ramírez (born 1990), Uruguayan football player
- Gloria Ramirez (1963–1994), American the toxic lady
- Hanley Ramírez (born 1983), first baseman for the Boston Red Sox
- Harold Ramírez (born 1994), Colombian baseball player
- Héctor Fabián Ramírez (born 1982), Colombian footballer
- Hernán Ramírez Necochea (1917–1979), Chilean historian
- Ilich Ramírez Sánchez (born 1949; also known as Carlos the Jackal), Venezuelan terrorist
- Jaime Patricio Ramírez (born 1967), Chilean football player
- Jennifer Ramírez Rivero (1978–2018), Venezuelan model and businesswoman
- Jesús Emilio Ramírez (1904–1981), Colombian geophysicist
- José Ramírez (disambiguation), multiple people
- Juan Andrés Ramírez (1947–2025), Uruguayan lawyer and politician
- Juan Diego Ramírez (born 1971), Colombian road cyclist
- Juan Sánchez Ramírez (1762–1811), Dominican Army General and Governor of the Dominican Republic
- Juana Ramírez (1790–1856), Venezuelan independence fighter
- Laureano Ramírez (born 1965), Dominican flyweight boxer
- Lucas Ramirez (born 2006), Dominican-Brazilian baseball player
- Luis Ramírez de Lucena, 16th-century Spanish chess grandmaster
- Manny Ramírez (born 1972), former MLB left fielder
- Maria Teresa Ramírez (born 1954), Mexican freestyle swimmer
- Mario Ramírez Treviño (born 1962), Mexican drug lord
- Marisa Ramirez (born 1977), American actress
- Martín Ramírez (1895–1963), self-taught 20th-century artist
- Mayra Ramírez (born 1999), Colombian football player
- Michael Ramirez (born 1961), American editorial cartoonist
- Noé Ramirez (born 1989), American baseball player
- Pablo Ramírez (born 1964), Spanish-language sports commentator
- Paul Henry Ramirez (born 1963), American contemporary painter
- Pedro Pablo Ramírez (1884–1962), 27th President of Argentina
- Phytos Ramirez (born 1995), Filipino actor and model
- Pilar Ramírez (born 1964), Mexican synchronized swimmer
- Pocholo Ramírez (de Arellano) (1932–2009), Filipino car racer and TV host
- Ramón Ramírez (born 1969), Mexican footballer
- Raúl Ramírez (born 1953), Mexican tennis player
- Reyna Haydee Ramírez, Mexican journalist
- Richard Ramirez (1960–2013), American serial killer known as "the Night Stalker" or "the Valley Intruder"
- Richard Ramirez (musician) (born 1970), noise musician
- Samuel Ramirez (farmer) (died 2000), Guatemalan shot in Belize
- Sancho Ramírez, King of Aragon (1042–1094)
- Sancho Ramírez, Count of Ribagorza (died 1117)
- Sara Ramirez (born 1975), Mexican actress and singer
- Sergio Ramírez (born 1942), vice-president of Nicaragua and writer
- Sue Ramirez (born 1996), Filipino actress and singer
- Tulio Ramírez Padilla (1960–2026), Venezuelan Roman Catholic bishop
- Twiggy Ramirez (born 1971), pseudonym of Jeordie White, bass guitarist for the band Marilyn Manson
- Victor Ramirez (disambiguation), several people
- Yohan Ramírez (born 1995), Dominican baseball player
- Thea Garcia-Ramirez, Belizean women's rights activist and politician

== Fictional characters ==
- Cruz Ramirez from Cars 3
- Eddie Ramirez from Nemesis: Reloaded
- Emily Ramirez from Close Enough
- James Ramirez from Call of Duty: Modern Warfare 2
- Jeremy Ramirez from The Adventures of Barry Ween, Boy Genius
- Juan Sánchez-Villalobos Ramírez (Sean Connery's character in the Highlander films)
- Ophelia Ramírez from The Life and Times of Juniper Lee
- Ruby Ramirez from Rusty Rivets
- Soos Ramirez from Gravity Falls
- Tuco Ramírez from The Good, the Bad and the Ugly
- In Modern Family, Gloria's maiden name is Ramírez
- Helen Ramirez from High Noon
- Ramírez is an arthritic old man wearing a Homburg hat in The Crying of Lot 49 by Thomas Pynchon
- the protagonist of the videogame Little Misfortune
- Reyna Avila Ramírez-Arellano from The Heroes of Olympus

== Other ==
- Ramirez family (farmers), various people shot in Belize
