= Ramiro =

Ramiro is a Spanish and Portuguese name from the latinisation of the Gothic given name *𐍂𐌰𐌽𐌰𐌼𐌹𐍂 (*Ranamir). Notable people with the name include:

== Given name ==
- Ramiro I of Asturias (c. 790–850), king of Asturias
- Ramiro II of León (c. 900–951), king of Leon
- Ramiro III of León (961–985), king of Leon
- Ramiro I of Aragon (before 1007–1063), king of Aragon
- Ramiro II of Aragon (c. 1075–1157), king of Aragon

=== A-C ===
- Ramiro Arias (born 1993), Argentine football defender
- Ramiro Arrue (1892–1971), Basque painter, illustrator, and ceramist
- Ramiro Benavides (born 1947), Bolivian tennis player
- Ramiro Benavides (swimmer) (born 1954), Guatemalan former swimmer
- Ramiro Benetti (born 1993), Brazilian footballer
- Ramiro Blacut (1944-2024), Bolivian footballer
- Ramiro Borja (born 1961), Ecudorean-American soccer player
- Ramiro Bravo (born 1962), Spanish foil fencer
- Ramiro Bruschi (born 1981), Uruguayan football forward
- Ramiro Cabrera (born 1988), Uruguayan cyclist
- Ramiro Canovas (born 1981), Argentine football center back
- Ramiro Carballo (born 1978), Salvadoran footballer
- Ramiro Carrera (born 1993), Argentine football midfielder
- Ramiro Cáseres (born 1994), Argentine footballer
- Ramiro Castro de la Mata (1931–2006), Peruvian physician
- Ramiro Castillo (1966–1997), Bolivian football midfielder
- Ramiro Cepeda (born 1975), Argentine football manager and player
- Ramiro Civita, Argentine cinematographer
- Ramiro Choc, Guatemalan Mayan peasant leader
- Ramiro L. Colón (1904–1983), general manager of the Cooperativa de Cafeteros de Puerto Rico
- Ramiro Corrales (born 1977), American soccer player
- Ramiro Cortés (1933–1984), American composer
- Ramiro Cortés (basketball) (1931–1977), Uruguayan basketball player
- Ramiro Costa (born 1992), Argentine football striker

=== E-L ===
- Ramiro Estrada (born 1962), Mexican swimmer
- Ramiro Fassi (born 1982), Argentine football defender
- Ramiro Fergonzi (born 1989), Argentine football forward
- Ramiro Figueiras Amarelle (born 1977), Spanish beach soccer player
- Ramiro Fróilaz (1120–1169), Leonese magnate, statesman, and military leader
- Ramiro Funes Mori (born 1991), Argentine footballer
- Ramiro Garay (born 1997), Argentine football midfielder
- Ramiro Garcés (disambiguation), multiple people, including:
  - Ramiro Garcés of Viguera (died 981), king of Viguera
  - Ramiro Garcés, Lord of Calahorra (c. 1052–1083), second son of king García Sánchez III of Navarre
- Ramiro Georgescu (born 1982), Romanian water polo player
- Ramiro Hernández García (born 1954), Mexican politician
- Ramiro Herrera (born 1989), Argentine rugby union footballer
- Ramiro Ledesma Ramos (1905–1936), Spanish national syndicalist politician, essayist, and journalist
- Ramiro de León Carpio (1942–2002), President of Guatemala
- Ramiro de León (basketball) (1938–2007), Uruguayan basketball player
- Ramiro Leone (born 1977), Argentine football midfielder

=== M-O ===
- Ramiro Macagno (born 1997), Argentine football goalkeeper
- Ramiro de Maeztu (1875–1936), Spanish political theorist, journalist, literary critic, and diplomat
- Ramíro Mañalich (1887–?), Cuban fencer
- Ramiro Marino (born 1988), Argentine professional BMX cyclist
- Ramiro Martinez (disambiguation), multiple people, including:
  - Ramiro Martinez (police officer) (born 1937), American police officer
  - Ramiro Martínez (rugby union) (born 1970), Argentine-born Italian rugby union player
  - Ramiro Martinez (sportscaster) (1923–2015), Cuban sportscaster
  - Ramiro Martinez, Jr. (born 1962), American criminologist
- Ramiro Martins (born 1941), Portuguese cyclist
- Ramiro Mayor (born 1991), Spanish footballer
- Ramiro Mendoza (born 1972), Panamanian baseball pitcher
- Ramiro Moyano (born 1990), Argentine rugby union player
- Ramiro Navarro (born 1943), Mexican football forward
- Ramiro Núñez de Guzmán (c. 1600–1668), Spanish nobleman
- Ramiro Oliveros, Spanish film and television actor
- Ramiro Ortiz, Nicaraguan businessman
- Ramiro Ortíz (1903–1982), Puerto Rican sports shooter
- Ramiro Otero Lugones (1928–2013), Bolivian lawyer, docent and human rights defender

=== P-V ===
- Ramiro Peña (born 1985), Mexican baseball infielder
- Ramiro Pez (born 1978), Italian-Argentine rugby union footballer
- Ramiro Ponce Monroy (1923–2010), Guatemalan vice presidential candidate
- Ramiro Pruneda (born 1983), Mexican American football offensive tackle
- Ramiro Prialé (1904–1988), Peruvian politician
- Ramiro Quintana (born 1977), Argentine Olympic show jumping rider
- Ramiro Rampinelli (1697–1759), Italian mathematician and physicist
- Ramiro Reducindo (born 1979), Mexican boxer
- Ramiro Rodrigues Valente (born 1933), Brazilian footballer
- Ramiro Saavedra (born 1984), Peruvian singer
- Ramiro Sánchez (1070–1116), noble kinsman of the kings of Navarre
- Ramiro Saraiva Guerreiro (1918–2011), Brazilian politician and diplomat
- Ramiro Suárez Corzo (born 1960), Colombian politician
- Ramiro Valdés (born 1932), Cuban politician
- Ramiro Villapadierna (born 1964), Spanish reporter and observer

== Surname ==
- Federico Ramiro (born 1962), Spanish basketball player
- Luis Ramiro (born 1976), Spanish singer-songwriter
- Marcelo Ramiro Camacho (born 1980), Brazilian footballer
- Rubén Ramiro Pastor (born 1993), Spanish football striker
- André Ramiro, A Brazilian actor

== Nickname ==
- Mauricio Hernández Norambuena (born 1958), Chilean guerrilla fighter, popularly known as "Commander Ramiro".
