= Carlos Ramírez =

Carlos Ramírez may refer to:

== Footballers ==
- Carlos Ramírez (futsal player), Mexican futsal player 2012 FIFA Futsal World Cup squads
- Carlos Ramírez (Paraguayan footballer), 1926 South American Championship
- Carlos Ramírez (Chilean footballer), 1987 FIFA World Youth Championship squads
- Carlos Ramírez (footballer, born 1987), Uruguayan footballer playing in Costa Rica
- Carlos Ramírez (Colombian footballer) (born 1988), Colombian footballer
- Carlos Ramírez (Mexican footballer) (born 1976), for Tigres UANL

== Other sportsmen ==
- Carlos Ramírez (baseball), Dominican baseball player
- Carlos Ramírez (BMX rider) (born 1994), Colombian BMX cyclist
- Carlos Ramírez (judoka) (born 1970), Salvadoran judoka
- Carlos Ramírez (road cyclist) (born 1994), Colombian road racing cyclist
- Carlos Ramírez (volleyball), Puerto Rican volleyball player, Colegio Católico Notre Dame
- Carlos Ramírez (wrestler), Venezuelan wrestler in Wrestling at the 2007 Pan American Games

== Other uses ==
- Carlos Ramirez (actor) (born 1973), American actor in The Falling (1987 film)
- Carlos Ramírez MacGregor (1903–1975), Venezuelan newspaperman, politician, and diplomat
- Carlos Ramírez Novoa (born 1897), Chilean politician
- Carlos Ramirez-Rosa (born 1989), American politician and public administrator
- Carlos Ramírez Ruiz (born 1962), Mexican politician
- Carlos Ramírez Sandoval (1939–2016), Mexican museum director and curator
- Carlos Ramírez (singer) (1916–1986), Colombian singer and actor
- Carlos Ramírez Suárez (1902–1978), Spanish lawyer and writer
- Carlos Ramírez Ulloa (1903–1980), Mexican civil engineer
- Carlos Betances Ramírez (1910–2001), only Puerto Rican to command a battalion in the Korean War
- Carlos D. Ramirez (1946–1999), American publisher
- Carlos María Ramírez (1847–1898), Uruguayan journalist, essayist and politician
- Carlos Ramirez (born 1989/90), artist of trollface
