= Ramiro (disambiguation) =

Ramiro is a Spanish and Portuguese name, used as both a given name and a surname.

Ramiro may also refer to:

- Ramiro, Valladolid, a municipality in the province of Valladolid, Castile and León, Spain
- Ramiro (film), a 2017 Portuguese film directed by Manuel Mozos
