= Ramiro Martinez =

Ramiro Martinez may refer to:

- Ramiro Martinez (police officer) (born 1937), American police officer
- Ramiro Martínez (rugby union) (born 1970), Argentine-born Italian rugby union player
- Ramiro Martinez (sportscaster) (1923–2015), Cuban sportscaster
- Ramiro Martinez Jr. (born 1962), American criminologist
- Ramiro Martínez (footballer), Argentine footballer
- Ramiro Martínez (handballer), Argentine handballer
