= 2026–27 Liga MX season =

80th professional season of the top-flight football league in Mexico

Liga MX
- Season: 2026–27
- Matches: 143
- Goals: 434 (3.03 per match)
- Top goalscorer: Apertura: Salomón Rondón (16 goals)
- Biggest home win: Apertura: Monterrey 6–1 Juárez (16 August 2026); Santos Laguna 5–0 Querétaro (17 October 2026); Cruz Azul 5–0 Juárez (17 October 2026)
- Biggest away win: Apertura: Juárez 1–5 Pumas UNAM (31 July 2026)
- Highest scoring: Apertura: León 3–5 América (17 October 2026)
- Longest winning run: Apertura: 6 matches Santos Laguna
- Longest unbeaten run: Apertura: 6 matches América; Santos Laguna
- Longest winless run: Apertura: 8 matches Juárez
- Longest losing run: Apertura: 8 matches Juárez
- Highest attendance: Apertura: 72,990; América vs Guadalajara (19 September 2026)
- Lowest attendance: Apertura: 5,658; Juárez vs Atlante (22 October 2026)
- Total attendance: Apertura: 3,239,179
- Average attendance: Apertura: 26,122
- All statistics correct as of 27 June 2026. Stats are from the regular season only Attendance does not include matches played behind closed doors. Source: Liga MX

The 2026–27 Liga MX season (known as the Liga BBVA MX for sponsorship reasons) is the 80th professional season of the top-flight football league in Mexico. The season will be divided into two championships—the Apertura 2026 and the Clausura 2027 —each in an identical format and each contested by the same 18 teams.

== Clubs ==
A total of 18 clubs will participate in the 2026–27 edition of the Liga MX. This season marks the return of Atlante, who returned to the league from the second tier after 12 years, after acquiring the registration of Mazatlán.

=== Stadiums and locations ===
Club	Location	Stadium	Capacity
América	Mexico City	Azteca	87,523
Atlante	Mexico City	Azteca	87,523
Atlas	Guadalajara, Jalisco	Jalisco	55,020
Atlético San Luis	San Luis Potosí, San Luis Potosí	Libertad Financiera	27,029
Cruz Azul	Mexico City	Azteca	87,523
Guadalajara	Zapopan, Jalisco	Akron	46,232
Juárez	Ciudad Juárez, Chihuahua	Olímpico Benito Juárez	19,703
León	León, Guanajuato	León	31,297
Monterrey	Guadalupe, Nuevo León	BBVA	53,500
Necaxa	Aguascalientes, Aguascalientes	Victoria	23,851
Pachuca	Pachuca, Hidalgo	Hidalgo	25,922
Puebla	Puebla, Puebla	Cuauhtémoc	51,726
Pumas UNAM	Mexico City	Olímpico Universitario	58,445
Querétaro	Querétaro, Querétaro	Corregidora	34,107
Santos Laguna	Torreón, Coahuila	Corona	29,101
Tigres UANL	San Nicolás de los Garza, Nuevo León	Universitario	41,886
Tijuana	Tijuana, Baja California	Caliente	31,158
Toluca	Toluca, State of Mexico	Nemesio Diez	27,273

Locations of the 2026–27 Liga MX teams
Greater Mexico City Liga MX football clubs

=== Personnel and kits ===
Club	Chairman	Head coach	Captain	Kit manufacturer	Shirt sponsor(s)	
Club	Chairman	Head coach	Captain	Kit manufacturer	Front	Other
América	Santiago Baños	(Uruguay) Guillermo Almada	(Mexico) Henry Martín	Adidas	Caliente	List: Front: None; Back: Corona, Coca-Cola; Sleeves: Restonic, GNP Seguros; Shorts: Caliente; Socks: Carl's Jr.
Atlante	Emilio Escalante	(Mexico) Miguel Herrera	TBA	Charly	Caliente	List: Front: Back: Almanta, Kosako, Corona; Sleeves: Electrolit, Hi! Sports; Shorts: Socks:
Atlas	Gerardo Casanova	(Argentina) Hernán Crespo	(Mexico) Aldo Rocha	Charly	Caliente	List: Front: Urrea, Totalplay, Perdura; Back: Seguros Atlas, Dalton Corporación, Akron Grupo; Sleeves: Berel, Omnibus de México, Red Cola, Electrolit; Shorts: Agua Skarch, Hospital Country 2000, Chimex; Socks: Perdura
Atlético San Luis	Jacobo Payán Espinosa	(Mexico) Diego Mejía	TBA	Charly	Canel's	List: Front: Daikin, BHFitness, Nexen Tire, Laboratorio Tequis, Cementos Moctezuma; Back: Caliente, Potosí, Seguros El Potosí; Sleeves: Primera Plus, Red Cola, Mobil; Shorts: Libertad Soluciones de Vida, H-E-B, BRR Binasa, Caliente; Socks: Cementos Moctezuma
Cruz Azul	Víctor Velázquez	(Mexico) Joel Huiqui	(Mexico) Érik Lira	Pirma	Cemento Cruz Azul	List: Front: Novibet, Nikko Auto-Parts; Back: Cemix; Sleeves: Bankaool; Shorts: None; Socks: None
Guadalajara	Amaury Vergara	(Argentina) Gabriel Milito	(Mexico) Luis Romo	Nike	Caliente	List: Front: MG Motor, Mercado Pago; Back: Omnilife, Akron Grupo, Axen Capital; Sleeves: GNP Seguros; Shorts: Caliente, Carl's Jr., Autobuses Futura; Socks: Perdura
Juárez	Andrés Fassi	(Argentina) Gustavo Lema	(Mexico) Sebastián Jurado	Joma	Caliente	List: Front: Caliente, Ciudad Juárez; Back: Del Rio, S-Mart; Sleeves: Volaris; Shorts: www.bravotienda.com; Socks: None
León	Jesús Martínez Murguia	(Argentina) Javier Gandolfi	TBA	Charly	Cementos Fortaleza	List: Front: Telcel, Ciudad Maderas, Office Depot; Back: Caliente, La Alemana, Mazda; Sleeves: Primera Plus, TUDN, Berel, Oxxo Gas; Shorts: Hotsson Hotels, Leche León, La Alemana, Broxel; Socks: Perdura
Monterrey	Dennis te Kloese	(Argentina) Matías Almeyda	TBA	Puma	Codere	List: Front: BBVA, Howo, Vidusa; Back: Tecate, Oxxo Gas, H-E-B; Sleeves: Berel, CREST México, Nowports; Shorts: Hospital Angeles; Socks: Viva Aerobus
Necaxa	Ernesto Tinajero Flores	(Uruguay) Martín Varini	(Mexico) Alexis Peña	Voit	Rolcar	List: Front: Playdoit, J.M. Romo, Bionda, BrandMe; Back: Playdoit, Grupo San Cristóbal, Sisolar, Epa!; Sleeves: Mobil, ETN Turistar, Megacable; Shorts: Gas Noel, Carl's Jr., ETN Turistar, L'ANQGEL, Playdoit, Centro Médico La Salud; Socks: Perdura
Pachuca	Armando Martínez Patiño	(Mexico) Benjamín Mora	(Mexico) Carlos Moreno	Skechers	Cementos Fortaleza	List: Front: Playdoit, JAC, Grupo Inmobiliario Crimsa, Telcel; Back: Office Depot, Pastes Kiko's, Playdoit; Sleeves: Berel, TUDN, Laboratorio Santa María; Shorts: Héroes por la Vida, Terrawind, Playdoit, Eurus Aviation, Broxel, Autobuses de Oriente; Socks: Pegazulejo Fortec
Puebla	Manuel Jiménez García	(Mexico) Gerardo Espinoza	TBA	Pirma	Caliente	List: Front: Volkswagen, Nikko Autoparts; Back: Banco Azteca, Red Cola, Ciudad Maderas, Mobil Super; Sleeves: Flanax, Totalplay, Leche Tamariz, Terrawind; Shorts: Beriscan Pro, Caliente, Carl's Jr., Hospital Angeles; Socks: Perdura
Pumas UNAM	Luis Raúl González	(Argentina) Esteban Solari	(Costa Rica) Keylor Navas	Puma	Raloy	List: Front: TBA; Back: Telcel, Suzuki, Caliente; Sleeves: Raloy Lubricantes, Berel, GNP Seguros; Shorts: Autobuses Futura, KEM Autopartes; Socks: None
Querétaro	Marc Spiegel	(Chile) Esteban González	TBA	Skechers	Pedigree	List: Front: Caliente, Conspiradores de Querétaro, Petro Figue's, Caja Morelia Valladolid, Sayer; Back: Ciudad Maderas, Afirme, M&M's, H-E-B; Sleeves: Red Cola, Bohn, Harinera Monarca, Garmo Click; Shorts: Caliente, Hospital Angeles; Socks: Perdura
Santos Laguna	Aleco Irarragorri Kalb	(Portugal) Renato Paiva	(Mexico) Carlos Acevedo	Charly	Soriana	List: Front: Peñoles, Lala, Grupo SIMSA; Back: Corona, Caliente, Lala; Sleeves: Omnibus de México, Sanatorio Español, Grupo Alameda, Berel; Shorts: Aeroméxico, Totalplay, City Club; Socks: Grupo SIMSA
Tigres UANL	Carlos Emilio González	(Mexico) Víctor Manuel Vucetich (interim)	(Uruguay) Fernando Gorriarán	Adidas	Cemex	List: Front: Cemento Monterrey; Back: Tecate, Afirme, H-E-B; Sleeves: Berel, Telcel, Chirey; Shorts: Oxxo Gas, Vertua; Socks: Viva Aerobus
Tijuana	Jorge Hank Inzunsa	(Uruguay) Sebastián Abreu	TBA	Reebok	Caliente	List: Front: Carl's Jr.; Back: Calimax, Caliente, Afirme, Telcel; Sleeves: Autobuses Baja California, Caliente; Shorts: Petsa Express, Billú, Caliente, Sukarne; Socks: Evervital
Toluca	Francisco Suinaga Conde	(Argentina) Antonio Mohamed	(Mexico) Alexis Vega	New Balance	Roshfrans	List: Front: None; Back: Corona, Caliente; Sleeves: Red Cola, Roshfrans; Shorts: Caliente; Socks: None

=== Managerial/coaching changes ===
Club	Outgoing manager/coach	Manner of departure	Date of vacancy	Replaced by	Date of appointment	Position in table	Ref.
Pre-Apertura changes
Atlante	(Mexico) Ricardo Carbajal	Named as assistant coach	28 April 2026	(Mexico) Miguel Herrera	28 April 2026	Pre–season	
Puebla	(Spain) Albert Espigares	Sacked	4 May 2026	(Mexico) Gerardo Espinoza	19 May 2026	Pre–season	
Santos Laguna	(Mexico) Omar Tapia (interim)	End of tenure as caretaker	19 May 2026	(Portugal) Renato Paiva	19 May 2026	Pre–season	
Monterrey	(Argentina) Nicolás Sánchez (interim)	End of tenure as caretaker	21 May 2026	(Argentina) Matías Almeyda	21 May 2026	Pre–season	
Cruz Azul	(Mexico) Joel Huiqui (interim)	Ratified as manager	24 May 2026	(Mexico) Joel Huiqui	24 May 2026	Pre–season	
Atlético San Luis	(Mexico) Raúl Chabrand (interim)	End of tenure as caretaker	31 May 2026	(Mexico) Diego Mejía	31 May 2026	Pre–season	
América	(Brazil) André Jardine	Mutual agreement	3 June 2026	(Uruguay) Guillermo Almada	7 June 2026	Pre–season	
Pachuca	(Argentina) Esteban Solari	End of contract	8 June 2026	(Mexico) Benjamín Mora	10 June 2026	Pre–season	
Pumas UNAM	(Mexico) Efraín Juárez	Mutual agreement	8 June 2026	(Argentina) Esteban Solari	21 June 2026	Pre–season	
Atlas	(Argentina) Diego Cocca	End of contract	13 July 2026	(Mexico) Omar Flores (interim)	13 July 2026	Pre–season	
Apertura changes
Atlas	(Mexico) Omar Flores (interim)	End of tenure as caretaker	25 July 2026	(Argentina) Hernán Crespo (Note: Announced on 16 July 2026, however he took office after week 2.)	16 July 2026	3rd	
Tigres UANL	(Argentina) Guido Pizarro	Resigned	28 July 2026	(Mexico) Hernán Elizondo (interim)	28 July 2026	15th	
Juárez	(Portugal) Pedro Caixinha	Sacked	2 August 2026	(Spain) Salvador Valero (interim)	2 August 2026	18th	
Tigres UANL	(Mexico) Hernán Elizondo (interim)	End of tenure as caretaker	20 August 2026	(Mexico) Víctor Manuel Vucetich (interim)	20 August 2026	16th	
Juárez	(Spain) Salvador Valero (interim)	End of tenure as caretaker	2 September 2026	(Argentina) Gustavo Lema	2 September 2026	18th	

== Torneo Apertura ==
The Apertura 2026 is the first tournament of the season and began on 16 July 2026. The defending champions are Cruz Azul.

For the 2026 Leagues Cup, there will only be a one-weekend break for the group stage, which will be played between 4 and 13 August. The rest of the competition will be played midweek, except for the third place and final matches, which will be played on 6 September, although the league will not be stopped that weekend.

The play-in round has been permanently eliminated starting this tournament, after having been suspended in the Clausura 2026 due to the calendar cuts imposed by the 2026 FIFA World Cup. Therefore, the eight highest-ranked teams will advance directly to the quarterfinals.

=== Regular phase ===
==== League table ====
Pos	Team	Pld	W	D	L	GF	GA	GD	Pts	Qualification
1	Cruz Azul (Q)	16	10	2	4	37	26	+11	32	Qualification for the quarter–finals (Note: The first eight places in the table will qualify for the Liguilla quarter-finals.)
2	América (Q)	17	8	6	3	38	24	+14	30	Qualification for the quarter–finals
3	Guadalajara (Q)	16	8	6	2	26	15	+11	30	Qualification for the quarter–finals
4	Atlas (Q)	17	8	4	5	30	33	−3	28	Qualification for the quarter–finals
5	Toluca (Q)	17	7	6	4	35	23	+12	27	Qualification for the quarter–finals
6	Monterrey (Q)	17	8	3	6	29	25	+4	27	Qualification for the quarter–finals
7	León (Q)	17	7	5	5	25	22	+3	26	Qualification for the quarter–finals
8	Pachuca (Q)	17	7	4	6	31	20	+11	25	Qualification for the quarter–finals
9	Tijuana (E)	17	6	7	4	26	22	+4	25	
10	Santos Laguna (E)	17	8	1	8	24	22	+2	25	
11	Pumas UNAM (E)	17	5	6	6	24	28	−4	21	
12	Puebla (E)	17	5	5	7	20	24	−4	20	
13	Atlético San Luis (E)	17	5	5	7	20	25	−5	20	
14	Querétaro (E)	16	6	2	8	18	24	−6	20	
15	Tigres UANL (E)	17	4	6	7	18	25	−7	18	
16	Atlante (E)	17	3	5	9	16	27	−11	14	
17	Necaxa (E)	16	3	4	9	17	28	−11	13	
18	Juárez (E)	17	3	3	11	16	37	−21	12	

Updated to match(es) played on 21 November 2026. Source: Liga MX
Rules for classification: 1) Points; 2) Goal difference; 3) Number of goals scored; 4) Head-to-head results between tied teams; 5) Number of goals scored away; 6) Highest relegation coefficient; 7) Fair Play points
(E) Eliminated; (Q) Qualified for the phase indicated

==== Results ====
Clubs will play every other once (either home or away), completing a total of 17 rounds.

Home \ Away	AMÉ	ATE	ATS	ASL	CAZ	GUA	JUÁ	LEÓ	MON	NEC	PAC	PUE	PUM	QUE	SAN	TIG	TIJ	TOL
América	—	—	—	3–0	—	2–2	—	—	1–1	—	1–2	2–0	—	—	3–0	—	1–1	2–2
Atlante	1–1	—	—	0–1	—	—	—	1–1	4–2	—	0–3	—	1–2	—	0–2	—	—	0–0
Atlas	2–5	1–1	—	—	—	1–1	—	—	0–2	—	1–4	4–3	1–1	1–3	—	2–1	—	—
Atlético San Luis	—	—	0–1	—	2–3	0–3	0–1	—	—	3–1	1–1	—	—	2–1	1–2	—	0–0	—
Cruz Azul	4–3	2–3	0–2	—	—	—	5–0	2–1	—	—	—	2–1	—	—	1–0	—	—	3–3
Guadalajara	—	4–2	—	—		—	1–0	—	—	1–0	—	—	3–0	0–2	—	1–1	5–2	0–2
Juárez	1–2	0–1	3–3	—	—	—	—	—	—	—	0–2	0–1	1–5	3–1	—	2–0	1–1	—
León	3–5	—	2–3	2–0	—	1–1	2–1	—	2–0	—	1–0	—	—	—	—	—	—	1–1
Monterrey	—	—	—	1–3	1–0	0–1	6–1	—	—	—	2–1	—	—	—	3–2	a	3–3	—
Necaxa	2–4	2–1	0–2	—	1–3	—	1–1	1–2	2–1	—	—	0–1	—	—	—	—	1–0	—
Pachuca	—	—	—	—	1–2	1–1	—	—	—	3–3	—	2–3	—	1–2	—	3–0	2–2	2–0
Puebla	—	1–1	—	1–1	—	1–1	—	1–1	1–4	—	—	—	1–2	—	3–2	—	—	0–1
Pumas UNAM	2–2	—	—	2–3	3–3	—	—	3–1	1–2	1–1	0–3	—	—	0–0	—	1–1	—	—
Querétaro	0–1	2–0	—	—	1–3	—	—	1–1	0–1		—	0–2	—	—	—	3–2	—	1–2
Santos Laguna	—	—	0–1	—	—	0–1	2–1	1–2	—	1–0	1–0	—	2–0	5–0	—	0–0	—	—
Tigres UANL	1–0	2–0	—	2–2	2–3	—	—	0–2	—	1–1	—	1–0	—	—	—	—	—	3–2
Tijuana	—	1–0	2–3	—	2–1	—	—	1–0	—	—	—	0–0	2–0	0–1	4–1	3–1	—	—
Toluca	—	—	5–2	1–1	—	—	4–0	—	4–0	3–1	—	—	1–2	—	2–3	—	2–2	—

Updated to match(es) played on 21 November 2026. Source: Liga MX
Legend: Blue = home team win; Yellow = draw; Red = away team win.
For upcoming matches, an "a" indicates there is an article about the rivalry between the two participants.

=== Regular season statistics ===
==== Top goalscorers ====
Players sorted first by goals scored, then by last name.

Rank	Player	Club	Goals
1	(Venezuela) Salomón Rondón	Pachuca	17
2	(Mexico) Henry Martín	América	11
3	(Argentina) Juan Brunetta	Tigres UANL	10
4	(Brazil) Juninho	Pumas UNAM	9
4	(Colombia) Óscar Estupiñán	Juárez	9
6	(Uruguay) Federico Viñas	Toluca	8
7	(Argentina) Julián Carranza	Necaxa	7
7	(Argentina) Lucas Ocampos	Monterrey	7
9	(Mexico) Alfonso Alvarado	León	6
9	(Mexico) Alí Ávila	Querétaro	6
9	(Colombia) Miguel Borja	América	6
9	(Belgium) Hugo Cuypers	Monterrey	6
9	(Argentina) Nicolás Ibáñez	Cruz Azul	6
9	(Mexico) Tahiel Jiménez	Santos Laguna	6
9	(Mexico) Andrés Montaño	Cruz Azul	6
9	(Mexico) Gilberto Mora	Tijuana	6
9	(Uruguay) Diego Rossi	Monterrey	6

Source: fotmob

==== Top assists ====
Rank	Player	Club	Assists
1	(Brazil) Helinho	Toluca	8
2	(Spain) Óliver Torres	Monterrey	6
3	(Argentina) Ezequiel Bullaude	Santos Laguna	5
3	(Morocco) Oussama Idrissi	Pachuca	5
3	(Mexico) Andrés Montaño	Cruz Azul	5
3	(Argentina) José Paradela	Cruz Azul	5
3	(Mexico) Carlos Rodríguez	Cruz Azul	5
3	(Argentina) Kevin Zenón	Atlas	5
9	(Argentina) Juan Brunetta	Tigres UANL	4
9	(Argentina) Nicolás Castro	Toluca	4
9	(United States) Mauricio Cuevas	Santos Laguna	4
9	(Portugal) Luís Esteves	Atlas	4
9	(Ecuador) Jhojan Julio	Atlante	4
9	(Paraguay) Robert Morales	Pumas UNAM	4
9	(Mexico) Rodolfo Pizarro	Pachuca	4

Source: fotmob

==== Clean sheets ====
Rank	Player	Club	Clean sheets	Avg.
1	(Mexico) Raúl Rangel	Guadalajara	6	0.87
1	(Mexico) Carlos Acevedo	Santos Laguna	6	1.29
3	(Argentina) Esteban Andrada	Monterrey	5	1.36
3	(Mexico) Carlos Moreno	Pachuca	5	1.18
3	(Mexico) José Antonio Rodríguez	Tijuana	5	1.29
3	(Argentina) Nahuel Guzmán	Tigres UANL	5	1.47
7	(Mexico) Óscar García	León	4	1.33
7	(Mexico) Ricardo Gutiérrez	Puebla	4	1.41
7	(Mexico) Guillermo Allison	Querétaro	4	1.44
7	(Colombia) Camilo Vargas	Atlas	4	1.94

Source: fotmob

==== Hat-tricks ====
Player	For	Against	Result	Date	Round
(Brazil) Juninho	Pumas UNAM	Juarez	1–5 (A)	31 July 2026	3
(Mexico) Henry Martín	América	Necaxa	2–4 (A)	27 September 2026	10
(Mexico) Tahiel Jiménez	Santos Laguna	Querétaro	5–0 (H)	17 October 2026	12

==== Scoring ====
- First goal of the season:
- (Mexico) Eugenio Pizzuto for Atlante against Necaxa
- Last goal of the season:

==== Discipline ====
Player

- Most yellow cards: 6
  - (Argentina) Lucas Abascia (Querétaro)
  - (Argentina) Sergio Barreto (Pachuca)
  - (Colombia) Bayron Duarte (Querétaro)
  - (Mexico) Francisco Nevárez (Juárez)
  - (Mexico) Iván Tona (Tijuana)
  - (Mexico) Francisco Venegas (Pachuca)
- Most red cards: 2
  - (Mexico) Carlos Salcedo (Monterrey)
  - (Argentina) Milton Valenzuela (Atlas)

Team

- Most yellow cards: 44
  - Pachuca
- Most red cards: 6
  - Atlas
- Fewest yellow cards: 16
  - Guadalajara
  - Puebla
- Fewest red cards: 0
  - Cruz Azul
  - Santos Laguna

Source: Liga MX

=== Attendance ===
Pos	Team	Total	High	Low	Average	Change
1	Monterrey	374,302	51,017	41,034	46,788	+0.6%
2	América	331,442	72,990	22,240	41,430	+82.1%
3	Guadalajara	312,938	41,586	36,008	39,117	+10.0%
4	Atlas	350,137	47,829	27,945	38,904	+106.5%
5	Tigres UANL	240,925	41,615	30,167	34,418	−15.4%
6	Cruz Azul	264,912	53,136	20,263	33,114	+45.8%
7	Toluca	210,939	27,273	25,599	26,367	−2.5%
8	Atlante	196,197	58,576	9,975	24,525	+1,223.5%^{1}
9	Tijuana	187,264	29,533	18,333	23,408	+8.4%
10	León	182,574	26,287	19,273	22,822	−0.1%
11	Santos Laguna	170,583	25,743	13,437	21,323	+84.6%
12	Puebla	124,643	42,714	6,513	20,774	+35.9%
13	Pumas UNAM	161,186	40,530	12,067	20,148	−13.1%
14	Querétaro	147,967	30,229	12,177	18,496	+24.9%
15	Necaxa	158,590	20,398	12,788	17,621	+11.2%
16	Atlético San Luis	132,146	22,270	11,916	16,518	+6.5%
17	Pachuca	95,451	21,673	6,882	13,636	+9.3%
18	Juárez	72,513	17,497	4,196	9,064	+3.3%
	League total	3,717,553	72,990	4,196	25,997	+20.6%

Source: Liga MX
Notes:
Only regular season listed.
Does not include matches played behind closed doors.
1: Atlante played last season at Liga de Expansión MX

== Aggregate tables ==
=== 2026 aggregate table ===
The 2026 aggregate table (the sum of points of both the Clausura 2026 and Apertura 2026 seasons) was used to determine the seedings for the 2027 Leagues Cup. It is currently unknown what benefits clubs in "Tier one" will have in 2027. For the 2026 edition, the top three clubs in "Tier one" hosted at least one match at home. The first ranked club hosted two matches while the second and third ranked clubs hosted one. Clubs ranked fourth through sixth, had benefits such as a neutral venue match or reduced travel.

Pos	Team	Pld	W	D	L	GF	GA	GD	Pts	Qualification or relegation
1	Guadalajara	33	19	9	5	59	32	+27	66	2026 Leagues Cup Tier one
2	Cruz Azul	33	19	8	6	68	44	+24	65	2026 Leagues Cup Tier one
3	Toluca	34	15	12	7	63	39	+24	57	2026 Leagues Cup Tier one
4	Pumas UNAM	34	15	12	7	58	45	+13	57	2026 Leagues Cup Tier one
5	Pachuca	34	16	8	10	56	39	+17	56	2026 Leagues Cup Tier one
6	América	34	15	10	9	58	41	+17	55	2026 Leagues Cup Tier one
7	Atlas	34	15	9	10	46	51	−5	54	2026 Leagues Cup Tier two
8	Tijuana	34	11	15	8	46	40	+6	48	2026 Leagues Cup Tier two
9	León	34	14	6	14	47	54	−7	48	2026 Leagues Cup Tier two
10	Monterrey	34	13	6	15	51	49	+2	45	2026 Leagues Cup Tier two
11	Tigres UANL	34	11	10	13	46	43	+3	43	2026 Leagues Cup Tier two
12	Querétaro	33	10	10	13	35	45	−10	40	2026 Leagues Cup Tier two
13	Atlético San Luis	34	10	8	16	44	52	−8	38	2026 Leagues Cup Tier three
14	Santos Laguna	34	11	4	19	45	60	−15	37	2026 Leagues Cup Tier three
15	Puebla	34	8	9	17	33	50	−17	33	2026 Leagues Cup Tier three
16	Necaxa	33	8	7	18	36	54	−18	31	2026 Leagues Cup Tier three
17	Juárez	34	8	7	19	42	69	−27	31	2026 Leagues Cup Tier three
18	Atlante (Note: Includes points accumulated as Mazatlán F.C.)	34	7	8	19	38	64	−26	29	2026 Leagues Cup Tier three

Updated to match(es) played on 21 November 2026. Source: Clausura 2026, Apertura 2026
Rules for classification: 1) Points; 2) Goal difference; 3) Number of goals scored; 4) Head-to-head results between tied teams; 5) Number of goals scored away; 6) Highest relegation coefficient; 7) Fair Play points

== Awards ==
=== Monthly awards ===
Tournament	Month	Manager of the Month		Player of the Month		Goal of the Month		Save of the Month		References
Tournament	Month	Manager	Club	Player	Club	Player	Club	Player	Club	References
Apertura 2026	August			(Uruguay) Brian Rodríguez	América					
Apertura 2026	September			(Mexico) Santiago Sandoval	Guadalajara					
