= Tigres UANL =

Association football club in Mexico

- Full name: Club Tigres de la Universidad Autónoma de Nuevo León
- Nicknames: Tigres (Tigers); La U de Nuevo León (The U of Nuevo León); Los Auriazules (The Golden-Blues); Los Tigres de México (The Tigers of Mexico)
- Short name: UANL, TIG
- Founded: 7 March 1960; 66 years ago (as Club Deportivo Universitario de Nuevo León)
- Stadium: Estadio Universitario
- Capacity: 41,615
- Owner: CEMEX
- President: Carlos Emilio González
- Manager: Víctor Manuel Vucetich (interim)
- League: Liga MX
- Apertura 2026: Regular phase: 15th of 18; Final phase: Not qualified
- Website: tigres.com.mx
Home colours	Away colours

Club Tigres de la Universidad Autónoma de Nuevo León, simply known as Tigres UANL, is a professional football club based in the Monterrey metropolitan area, Nuevo León. The club competes in Liga MX, the highest level of Mexican football, and plays its home matches at Estadio Universitario. Founded in 1960 as Club Deportivo Universitario de Nuevo León, the club represents the Autonomous University of Nuevo León (UANL) and adopted its current name in 1967.

In domestic competitions, Tigres UANL has won eight Liga MX titles, three Copa MX titles and four Campeón de Campeones. In international competitions, the club has won one CONCACAF Champions League, one North American SuperLiga and two Campeones Cup. Tigres finished as runners-up in the 2015 Copa Libertadores, and reached the 2020 FIFA Club World Cup final, becoming the first Mexican and CONCACAF club to reach the final of a FIFA worldwide competition.

Tigres' first major trophy was the 1975–76 Copa México, defeating Club América 3–2 on aggregate in the final, becoming the first club from Nuevo León to win an official national title. Since 1996 the club has been managed by Sinergia Deportiva, a sports-management company associated with Cemex. The club's traditional colors are gold and blue. It is one of the two major professional clubs in the state of Nuevo León, alongside their rivals C.F. Monterrey; their rivalry is known as the Clásico Regiomontano.

== History ==
=== Founding and promotion to Primera División, Cup and League champions ===

1977–78 season Championship starting line-up

Club de Fútbol Tigres de la Universidad Autónoma de Nuevo León was founded on 7 March 1960. They previously were named the Jabatos de Nuevo León. In 1967, their venue, the Estadio Universitario was built. In the 1973–74 season, José "Ché" Gómez guided the team to the title and promotion to the Primera División de México, now Liga MX. They defeated the Leones Negros de la Universidad de Guadalajara for 3–2. In the 1975–76, Tigres won their first domestic cup, the Copa México (now Copa MX), against América after winning 3–2.

Under the command of Uruguayan coach Carlos Miloc and players such as Tomás Boy and Gerónimo Barbadillo, for the 1977–78 season Tigres aimed to the league championship. In the quarter-finals of the liguilla (play-offs), they defeated Estudiantes Tecos by 1–0 and 3–2 (4–2). In the semi-finals Tigres defeated Cruz Azul 0–1 and 3–0 (3–1). In the finals they defeated UNAM 2–0 and 1–1 (3–1). Tigres made their best season ever with 48 points in the 1978–79, but did not reach the finals.

In the 1979–80 season, Tigres made it to the finals against Cruz Azul. In the first leg, Cruz Azul won 1–0 at the Estadio Universitario, and in the second leg, at the Estadio Azteca, Tigres, although down 3–0 at one point, rallied back to ensure a 3–3 draw. Nonetheless, Tigres still lost the finals by an aggregate scoreline of 4–3. In the 1981–82 season, they won their second League championship against Atlante at the Estadio Azteca. In the quarter-finals of postseason, they tied with Guadalajara 1–1 and 1–1 (2–2). In the semi-finals, they defeated América 2–0 and 0–1 (2–1), and in the finals they tied 2–1 and 0–1 (2–2) against Atlante. Tigres won by penalty shoot-out ending 3–1 (5–3 aggregate). In the 1983–84, they lost in quarter-finals against Pumas UNAM 1–0; 0–3 (1–3). In the 1986–87 season, they lost in the semi-finals against Monarcas Morelia 3–2 and 0–2 (3–4). In 1988, after fourteen years in the team, the iconic Mexican midfielder Tomás Boy retired. In the 1989–90 season, meanwhile, Tigres finished the tournament as the first place of their group with 40 points and went to liguilla. They lost in quarter-finals by 3–2 and 1–3 (4–5) against Club Universidad de Guadalajara. In 1990, Tigres lost the finals of the 1989–90 Copa Mexico against Puebla. In the 1992–93 season, they earned 44 points and went to play-offs. In the quarter-finals, Tigres lost 0–2 and 2–4 (2–6) against Club León.

=== Relegation, quick return to Primera División, 2001 and 2003 runner-up ===
In 1996, Tigres hired the Chilean international forward Claudio Núñez and after several years of ups and downs the team won their second domestic cup defeating Atlas by 2–1 but were relegated to Primera División A, now Ascenso MX, because of negative results of past seasons. Note that the Mexican League uses a percentage-based relegation system, in which the team with the worst performance percentage by year (instead of the worst team in the season) is relegated. Under the command of Victor Manuel Vucetich, the team qualified to play-offs in 1996 but because of the relegation they were unable to compete. After some negotiations, the administration of the team was given for ten years to Sinergia Deportiva, a trust-holder run by CEMEX. In 1997, after two consecutive Primera División A championships, the team returned to the Primera División. In 1998, Tigres hired international striker Luis Hernández.

Under the command of the Brazilian coach Ricardo Ferretti, Tigres finished the Verano 2001 season in the fourth place with 27 points and secured postseason. In the quarter-finals Tigres lost by 3–1 and 2–2 (5–3) against Puebla. In the Invierno 2001 season, Tigres finished the tournament as leader with 36 points. In the play-offs, they beat Santos Laguna in the quarter-finals 1–1 and 3–0 (4–1). In the semi-finals, they tied with Cruz Azul 1–1 (0–1 and 1–0), and because of the 36 points they achieved in the tournament, they went to the next stage. In the finals, Tigres lost 2–0 and 1–1 (3–1) against Pachuca in the Estadio Universitario. In June 2002, the talented Argentine attacking midfielder Walter Gaitán was hired, a player that later would become an icon of the team. In the Clausura 2003, Tigres finished the tournament as the fourth place with 34 points, and went to postseason. In the quarter-finals, they defeated Toluca by 2–1 and 2–2 for an aggregate of 4–3. In the semi-finals, Tigres lost against arch-rival Monterrey. In the first game they lost by 4–1, while in the second Tigres won 2–1 for an aggregate score of 5–3. After the loss, coach Ricardo Ferretti was fired.

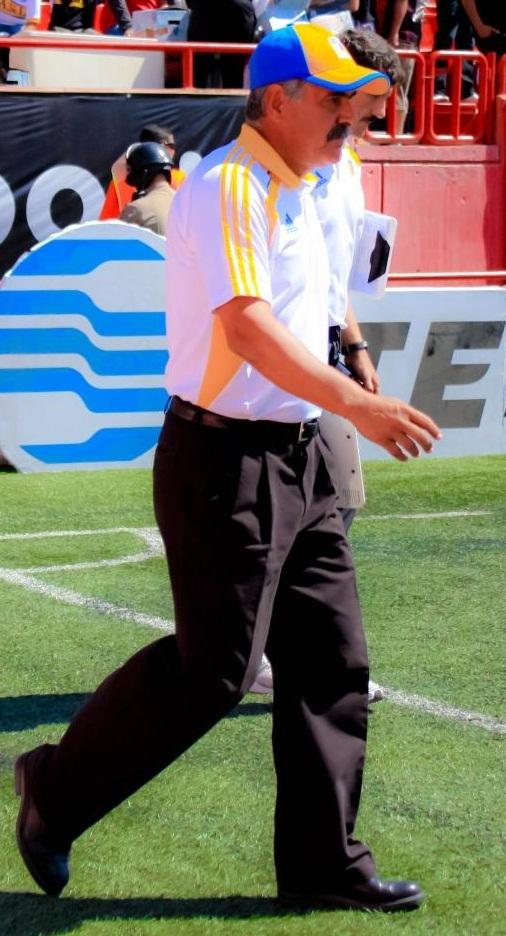
Coach Ricardo Ferretti has given some of the team's highest numbers.

On the Apertura 2003, now under the command of Argentine coach Nery Pumpido (with a team that Ferretti build), Tigres finished the tournament as leader now with 38 points. In the play-offs, they tied 1–0 and 1–2 (2–2) with Cruz Azul in the quarter-finals. In the semi-finals, they faced Toluca, who was now under the command of Ricardo Ferretti, and defeated them 0–1 and 2–0 (2–1). In the finals, Tigres lost 1–3 and 1–0 (3–2) once more against Pachuca in the Estadio Universitario. In the Clausura 2004, Argentine striker Andrés Silvera finished the tournament as one of the top goal scorers, but Tigres ended in 12th place and missed the play-offs. That same tournament they scored the biggest result in a Clásico Regiomontano, beating archrival Monterrey 6–2.

In October 2004, Sinergia Deportiva purchased the rights to a franchise in the MISL called the "Monterrey Tigres". However, due to conflicts with the previous MISL franchise "Monterrey Fury", the team elected not to complete the purchase of the team, and the MISL terminated the indoor franchise in December 2004. In the Clausura 2005, Tigres went to postseason and tied with Monarcas Morelia 2–2 and 2–2 (4–4) in the quarter-finals, and Morelia went to the next stage because of the points they achieved in the regular season.

In the Apertura 2005, Walter Gaitán finished the season as the top scorer of the tournament and Tigres went to play-offs in 8th place. In the quarter-finals, under the command of the iconic Osvaldo Batocletti, Tigres played the historical "Aztecazo", a way to describe a difficult victory over América or the Mexico national team in their venue, the Estadio Azteca. In the first game, Tigres lost in the Estadio Universitario by a 1–3 score. Against all odds, however, they defeated América in the second game 4–1 for an aggregate scoreline of 5–4, leaving América out of the postseason. In the semi-finals, Tigres drew Monterrey after 1–0 and 1–2 (2–2) scorelines, although Monterrey progressed to the next round because of the points in the tournament.

On 3 August 2006, CEMEX, the company that controls Tigres, celebrated its first 100 years with a match between Tigres and Barcelona in Monterrey. The game ended with the locals losing by 3–0. Sindey Balderas of Tigres scored an own goal, Ronaldinho scored with a free kick and later passed to Eiður Guðjohnsen for a third goal.

Tigres finished the Clausura 2007 season as eighth with 23 points, securing play-offs. Tigres lost in quarter-finals against Guadalajara 3–1 and 3–2 (6–3). In December 2007, Tigres hired who would become the last idol of the team, the skilled Argentine attacking midfielder Lucas Lobos. On 19 July 2008, Tigres played Atlético Madrid as their official presentation for the Apertura 2008 tournament. Atlético opened the score with goals from John Heitinga and Diego Forlán for a sturdy 2–0 in favour of the Spanish side. Tigres responded well to this for Blas Pérez and Manuel Viniegra tied the game 2–2. In the Apertura 2008, under the command of Manuel Lapuente, Tigres ended the tournament as sixth place and qualified for the play-offs. They tied in the quarter-finals against Atlante 1–1 and 1–1 (2–2), though Atlante progressed to semi-finals because they finished the regular season higher than Tigres, in third place.

=== Close call, third Ferretti era, Team of the Decade, 2023 champions ===
In 2010, Santiago Martínez presided over the team's worst season in the past few years. On 27 March 2010, after their seventh loss in the season, and with only 25% effectiveness, the fans and media heavily criticized coach Daniel Guzmán. Eventually, Martínez was fired and replaced by a former president of the team, Alejandro Rodríguez. He signed Ricardo Ferretti as the head coach for the third time, upon which the face of the team changed completely. Tigres was saved from relegation and became one of the most competitive teams in the league. With the adherence of Argentine winger Damián Álvarez, Brazilian attacking midfielder Danilinho and Chilean striker Héctor Mancilla to captain Lucas Lobos, the offensive line of Tigres became the so-called "Cuatro Fantásticos" ("Fantastic Four").

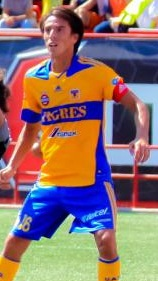
Lucas Lobos was of great importance in achieving the 2011 Apertura title, ending 29 years of drought without title.

In the Clausura 2011 season, Tigres finished the tournament as leader with 35 points and as the best defence in the history of the short seasons, allowing only 9 goals in 17 games. Tigres faced Guadalajara in the postseason. In the first leg of the quarter-finals, Tigres lost 3–1, while in the second they tied to 1–1 at the Estadio Universitario. With an aggregate score of 4–2, Tigres was eliminated. On the Apertura 2011, Tigres hired Carlos Salcido and was the best defense again, this time allowing 13 goals in 17 games. In playoffs, they faced old rival Pachuca: In the first leg of quarter-finals, Tigres defeated Pachuca by 1–0, while in the second they won 3–0 at the Estadio Universitario for an aggregate score of 4–0. In the semi-finals, Tigres beat Querétaro 1–0 in the second leg after a 0–0 draw in the first. In the finals, they faced Santos Laguna. In the first leg, Tigres won 1–0 in Torreón with goal from Damián Álvarez. On 11 December 2011, with goals from Héctor Mancilla, Danilinho and Alan Pulido, Tigres won 3–1 at the Estadio Universitario, becoming champion for the third time after 29 years.

For the Clausura 2012, Tigres hired Brazilian forward Edno and midfielder Elias Hernández. The season ended with Tigres in fifth place, securing postseason. In the quarter-finals, they beat Monarcas Morelia 1–0 at the Estadio Universitario with a goal from Héctor Mancilla, while in the second leg, they triumphed 4–1 in Morelia with goals from Hugo Ayala, Edno, Lucas Lobos and Elias Hernández; the aggregate score was 5–1. In semi-finals, they faced old rival Santos Laguna; in the first leg, at the Estadio Universitario, the teams drew 1–1, with Lobos scoring for Tigres. In the second, after a total domain of Tigres, and winning 2–0 with goals of Mancilla, Santos tied dramatically 2–2 with goals from Oribe Peralta in the 87th and 90th minutes. With an aggregate score of 3–3, Santos progressed to the next phase because they had finished the regular season in first place. In the Apertura 2012, Tigres replaced Héctor Mancilla with Spanish forward Luis García. Tigres finished in 12th place, thus missing playoffs.

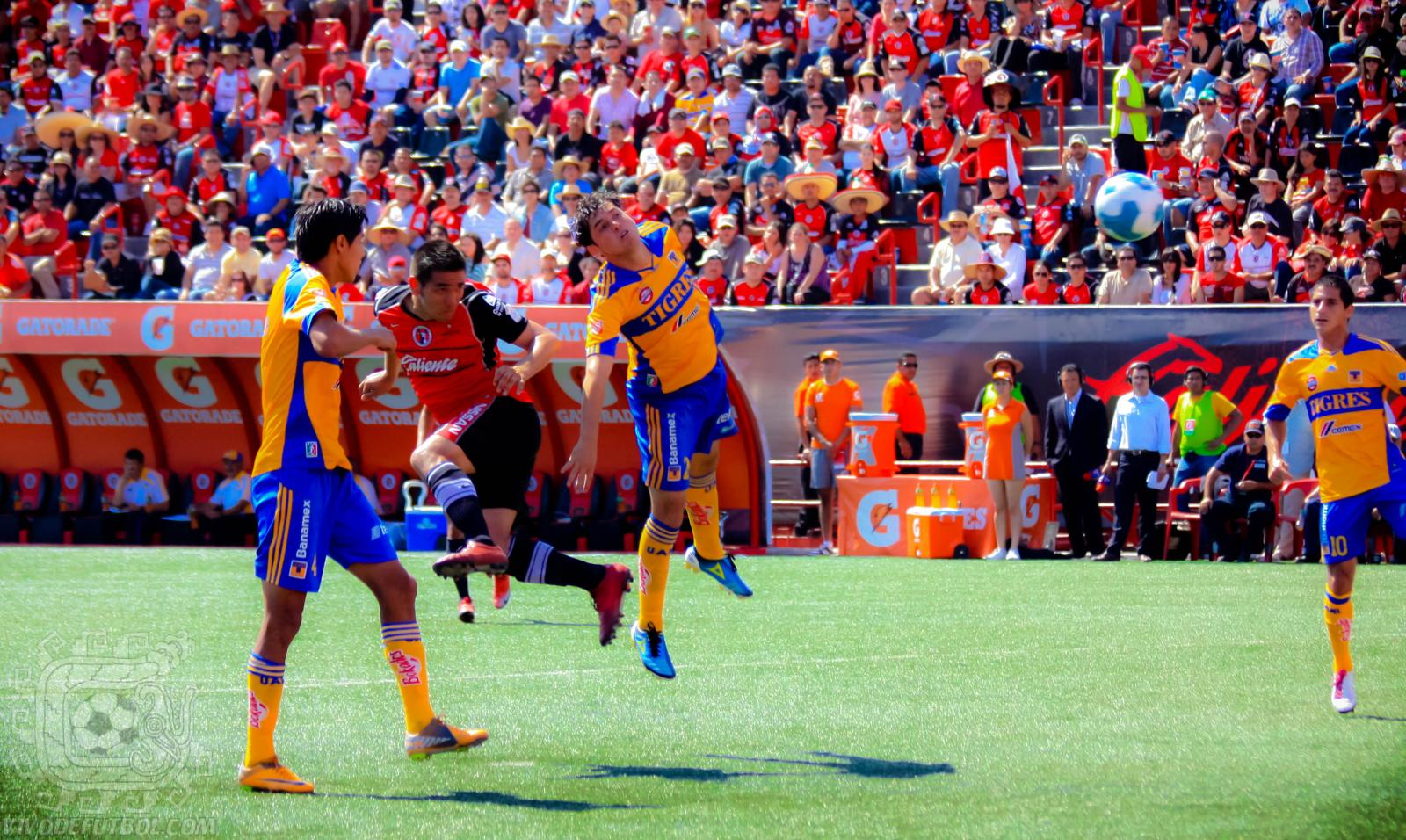
Tigres against Xolos de Tijuana in 2011

Tigres brought in experienced Argentine striker Emanuel Villa while Danilinho returned from his loan to Brazil, giving the team a highly offensive power for the Clausura 2013 season. The regular season ended with Tigres as the leader with 35 points and only two defeats. Querétaro was the eighth-placed and meant to be the rival of Tigres, but was relegated to Ascenso MX, so Monterrey was dragged to postseason. In the away leg of quarter-finals, Monterrey defeated Tigres 1–0 in a game where Monterrey had less ball possession and offensive plays. In the second game, Tigres had to win by 1–0 or by a two-goal advantage because of the away goals rule (3–1, 4–2, 5–3). Tigres came out aggressive and Danilinho scored a goal early in the game. Minutes later, with a game totally handled by Tigres, Israel Jiménez scored an own goal that tied the game at 1–1, and Tigres lost with an aggregate score of 2–1.

For the Apertura 2013 tournament, Tigres hired midfielders Guido Pizarro and Édgar Lugo. Finishing the tournament in eight place, the team went to playoffs. In quarter-finals, they faced América, leaders of the tournament and reigning champions. In the home game at the Estadio Universitario, they tied by 2–2, with Guido Pizarro and Alan Pulido scoring for Tigres. In the away game, at the Estadio Azteca, the teams drew at 1–1, leaving Tigres out of the postseason. After the game, coach Ricardo Ferretti criticized the work of the referee, claiming that América is the only team in the world that "plays with 12 men".

Tigres hired Colombian winger Hernán Darío Burban, defender Jorge Iván Estrada and Argentine striker Emanuel Herrera for the Clausura 2014 tournament, but finished the season in 14th place, missing the playoffs. On 9 April 2014, Tigres won the Clausura 2014 Copa MX against Alebrijes de Oaxaca 3–0 at the Estadio Universitario. Ricardo Ferretti became the first coach in Mexico to win a league and cup title with the same team. By winning the Clausura 2014 Copa MX, Tigres secured the Supercopa MX and faced Monarcas Morelia, winners of the Apertura 2013 Copa MX. Tigres lost the 2014 Supercopa MX against Morelia and failed to qualify to the following year's Copa Libertadores as "Mexico 3".

For the Apertura 2014 tournament, Tigres hired the Argentine goalkeeper Nahuel Guzmán, American striker Herculez Gomez, Argentine striker Marco Ruben, Ecuadorian winger Joffre Guerrón, young defender Antonio Briseño and the international Uruguayan midfielder Egidio Arévalo Ríos. Tigres finished the regular season in second place with 31 points, securing postseason. In quarter-finals, Tigres tied by 1–1 and 1–1 against Pachuca for an aggregate of 2–2. In semifinals, Tigres drew against Toluca 0–0 in both games. On 11 December 2014, in the first match of the finals against América, Tigres won 1–0 with goal of Joffre Guerrón at the Estadio Universitario. On 14 December, in the second game, Tigres lost 3–0 at the Estadio Azteca in a controversial match where Hernán Darío Burbano, Damián Álvarez and goalkeeper Nahuel Guzmán were sent off on red cards, leaving Tigres with eight men. Tigres lost the finals by an aggregate of 3–1.

Tigres hired Brazilian forward Rafael Sóbis and finished the Clausura 2015 regular season in first place with 29 points, earning a ticket to playoffs. In the away game of the quarter-finals against Santos Laguna, Tigres tied 1–1 with goal of Guerrón at the Estadio Corona. In the home game, Tigres lost 1–0; with an aggregate score of 1–2, Tigres was eliminated.

For the Apertura 2015 season, the team brought in wingers Jürgen Damm and Javier Aquino and the international French striker André-Pierre Gignac. Tigres finished the season in fifth place with 28 points, best defense allowing 16 goals and securing playoffs. Gignac scored 11 goals in the regular season, the highest number for a Tigres player in the first season. In the postseason, with goals from Gignac and Damián Álvarez, Tigres won the first quarter-final leg 2–1 against Jaguares de Chiapas at the Estadio Universitario. In the second leg, they won 1–0 at Chiapas again with a goal of Gignac. In the semi-finals against Toluca, Tigres won the away leg 2–0 with goals of Damián Álvarez and Javier Aquino after a 0–0 draw in the first. Tigres reached to the finals against UNAM. In the home leg, with goals of Gignac, via a penalty kick, Aquino and Rafael Sóbis, Tigres won by 3–0, while in the second leg, at the Estadio Olímpico Universitario, UNAM won 3–0. With the aggregate score at 3–3, the game went to extra time. In the 103rd minute Gignac scored the 1–3 goal, making the aggregate scoreline 4–3. With only one minute left of extra time remaining, however, UNAM scored the 4–1 goal and equalized the aggregate scoreline at 4–4, sending the match to a penalty shoot-out. Gignac shot the first for Tigres, converting, and with similar conversions from Juninho, Rivas and Israel Jiménez, Tigres prevailed 4–2 to defeat Pumas and claim the Liga MX Apertura 2015 championship in dramatic fashion.

The team hired the Argentine attacking midfielder Lucas Zelarayán, Paraguayan striker Fernando Fernández and resigned Chilean striker Héctor Mancilla after his departure in 2012 for the Clausura 2016 season. Gignac scored 13 goals in regular season and finished as the top goal scorer of the tournament. Tigres finished the Clausura 2016 season in eight place with 24 points, securing playoffs, where they would face Monterrey. There, Tigres lost the home game 3–1 and won the away game 2–1, losing on an aggregate score of 4–3.

For the Apertura 2016 season, Tigres signed Argentine forward Ismael Sosa and their second French striker Andy Delort. On 10 July 2016, Tigres won the 2016 edition of the Campeón de Campeones Cup against Pachuca FC by 1–0 at the StubHub Center in Carson, California. Tigres finished the Apertura 2016 regular season in third place with 30 points and tied with Tijuana as the best defense, allowing 13 goals in 17 games. In playoffs, Tigres tied the first leg of quarterfinals in Mexico City against UNAM by 2–2. In the second leg, Tigres beat UNAM by 5–0 at the Estadio Universitario with a hat-trick of Gignac. At semifinals, Tigres faced León. In the first leg, Tigres won by 1–0 with a goal of Gignac after a cross from Ismael Sosa at the Estadio León. In the second leg, Tigres achieved a home victory of 2–1 with goals of Gignac and Zelarayán. In the finals against América, the teams tied 1–1 in the first leg at Estadio Azteca, Gignac scoring for Tigres. In the historical second leg played for the first time on 25 December, the teams tied 0-0 and went to overtime at the Estadio Universitario. At 95' Edson Álvarez scored the 1-0 for América and at 118' Jesús Dueñas tied dramatically and led the match to a penalty shoot-out. Nahuel Guzmán stopped three shots and with Gignac, Juninho and Guido Pizarro scoring their own, Tigres became the Apertura 2016 champions.

For the Clausura 2017, Tigres hired Chilean international forward Eduardo Vargas. Tigres finished the Clausura 2017 season in seventh place with 25 points and the best defense allowing twelve goals in 17 games. In the first leg of playoffs at the Estadio Universitario, Tigres faced Monterrey and beat them by 4–1 with Gignac and Dueñas scoring twice each. In the second leg of quarterfinals at the Estadio BBVA, Gignac scored twice for the 2–0 victory. Tigres beat Monterrey by an aggregate of 6-1 and secured semifinals. In the first leg of semifinals, Tigres defeated Tijuana by 2–0 with goals of Aquino and Zelarayán at the Estadio Universitario. With goals of Aquino and Jürgen Damm, Tigres beat Tijuana by 2–0 in the second leg at the Estadio Caliente, for a 4-0 aggregate. In the home leg of the finals against Guadalajara, Gignac scored twice and matched the score to 2–2. Tigres lost the second leg by 2–1 at the Estadio Omnilife for an aggregate of 4–3, in a controversial match where press and audience claimed that referee Luis Enrique Santander, who had refereed all of the home games of Guadalajara in play-offs, did not penalize a foul of Guadalajara's defender Jair Pereira over Ismael Sosa inside the penalty area minutes before the end of the match. Santander would later recognize and apologize for the mistake.

For the Apertura 2017 season, Tigres acquired Ecuadorian forward Enner Valencia, Brazilian midfielder Rafael Carioca and French defender Timothée Kolodziejczak. On 16 July 2017, Tigres beat Guadalajara by 1–0 at the StubHub Center in Carson, California, becoming the back-to-back Champion of the Campeón de Campeones Cup by winning the 2017 and 2016 editions. Tigres finished the regular season of the Apertura 2017 as second place with 32 points. In playoffs, Tigres tied 1–1 in both legs against Club León and by an aggregate of 2–2, secured semifinals due table position. In semifinals, Tigres defeated Club América by 1–0 in the away game and 3–0 in home. Tigres played the historical final against archrival CF Monterrey. In the first leg the teams tied by 1–1 at the Estadio Universitario. In the Estadio BBVA Bancomer, Tigres beat Monterrey by 2–1 with goals of Edu Vargas and Francisco Meza. In the aftermath, winger Jürgen Damm stated: "We knew we were facing the best team of the season, but, they were facing the best team of the decade." After the fourth title since 2010, Tigres was dubbed by the media as "The Team of the Decade".

For the Apertura 2018 season, Tigres rehired Guido Pizarro and on 15 July 2018, defeated Santos by 4–0 at the StubHub Center in Carson, California, becoming Champion of the Campeón de Campeones Cup for the third time in a row. On 19 September 2018, Tigres beat Toronto FC by 3–1 in the inaugural edition of the Campeones Cup hosted by Toronto at the BMO Field.

In the Clausura 2019, Tigres hired international defender Carlos Salcedo and finished the season in second place. In playoffs, Tigres tied an aggregate score of 2–2 against Pachuca. In semifinals, Tigres tied an aggregate of 1–1 against rival Monterrey. In the home leg of the finals, Tigres beat León by 1–0 with goal of André-Pierre Gignac. In the second leg, the teams tied by 0-0 and Tigres conquered their seventh League championship. For the Apertura 2019 season, Tigres hired international defender Diego Reyes.

On May 20, 2021, after finishing the Clausura 2021 season in tenth place and losing against Atlas the reclassification, Tigres hired coach Miguel Herrera, ending an eleven-year successful era under command of Ricardo Ferretti. For the Apertura 2021 season, Tigres hired the international French and 2018 World Cup champion Florian Thauvin but lost against Club León in semifinals.

After a 2-2 aggregate draw in quarterfinals against Pachuca that eliminated the team in the Apertura 2022 season and stating that the squad "was going old", Herrera was sacked of Tigres and Diego Cocca took over for the Clausura 2023 season. Cocca left for the Mexico national team head coaching and Tigres hired Marco Antonio Ruiz, who was working in the team as an assistant. After losing 1–2 to Mazatlán, a team that only won 3 games in the Clausura 2023 season and considered as the worst team of the tournament, Ruiz was ceased.

On April 10, 2023, coach Robert Dante Siboldi arrived to the team. Siboldi played for Tigres and became an idol in the mid-1990s. A talented goalkeeper, he was part of the squad that was relegated to Primera División "A", now Liga Expansión on March 24, 1996, and returned to the top tier after a year. When he took over, Tigres tied against Querétaro by 0-0, defeated Puebla by 1-0 and lost against León by 3–0. With goal of Sebastián Córdova, Tigres defeated Puebla FC in the "repechaje" (reclassification) for the liguilla (playoffs) by 1–0, setting the team against Toluca in quarterfinals. With goals of Gignac, Córdova, Vigón and López, the team won the home game 4–1, and lost the away game to 3–1. With a final score of 5–4, Tigres reached seminalfinals. Córdova scored the goal of the second game. On seminalfinals, they faced city rival Monterrey, team that finished the regular season as leader with 40 points out of 51 possible, winning 13 games and losing only 3. Tigres and Monterrey tied 1–1 in the first leg. In the second game, Tigres won by 0-1 for a 2–1 final score. Córdova scored both goals for Tigres. Set in the finals, Tigres faced Guadalajara in a rematch of the polemic Clausura 2017 finals. The teams tied in the first leg by 0-0. In the second leg, Tigres was losing by 2–0 in the first half. By the second half the team tied 2–2 with a penalty kick by Gignac and a header of Córdova. Guido Pizarro scored the 3–2 with a header in overtime and became champions. Sebastián Córdova was the key player by scoring five goals in six games. The team would follow up the league title with 2 more trophies, the 2023 Campeon de Campeones over Pachuca and the 2023 Campeones Cup over LAFC. Tigres would then fall just short of repeating as league winners, losing to Club America in the 2023 Apertura final. Siboldi later was controversially dismissed after the 2024 Clausura playoffs.

On March 2, 2025, midfielder Guido Pizarro retired as a player and replaced Veljko Paunović as the head coach. Tigres made it to the final of both the 2025 Apertura and the 2026 CONCACAF Champions Cup, but were defeated both times by Toluca in those finals, both times via penalties, and both times at the Estadio Nemesio Diez, leaving Andre-Pierre Gignac empty-handed as he ended his Tigres career without winning one last title. Pizarro later resigned as head coach on July 28, 2026, just 2 matches in to the 2026 Apertura campaign.

=== International activity ===
In January 2005, the team won the InterLiga Championship in Houston, Texas. With this, they qualified for the prestigious Copa Libertadores de América. This was the first time the team qualified to any international tournament.

In the Copa Libertadores Tigres played their first ever game in that tournament against Alianza Lima in Peru on 15 February 2005 (away, score: 0–0) and 3 May 2005 (home, score: 0–0). Their first ever win on the tournament, on 23 February 2005, against Caracas, from Venezuela (home, score: 3–1), and on 13 April 2005 (away, score: 2–5). This last game is the biggest-scoring game the team has had in its history on the tournament. In the same group was also the Banfield. Tigres confronted them on 15 March (home, score: 2–2) and on 6 April 2005 (away, score: 0–3).

Tigres qualified (along with Banfield) into the next stage, where they met previous year champion Colombian team Once Caldas. On 19 May 2005, both teams tied (away, score: 1–1) and then, Tigres won in the second game on 26 May 2005 (home, score: 2–1) thus qualifying to quarter-finals against São Paulo, who later went on to become champion, and who only lost a match in this tournament against this team.

In the Quarter-Finals, the first game on 1 June 2005 was lost (away, score: 0–4) and the next game on 15 June 2005 was won (home, score: 2–1). The aggregate score was 5–2 against, and the team was eliminated from the championship. With Tigres, Hugo Sánchez became the first person born in Monterrey to ever score in the tournament.

In January 2006, after defeating their arch-rival, Monterrey, at the Home Depot Center in California, Tigres won their second consecutive Interliga and became the first Mexican team to qualify to two consecutive Copa Libertadores de América.

In this edition, Tigres faced the Universidad Católica from Chile, the Corinthians, from Brazil, and Deportivo Cali, of Colombia.

This was a tougher group stage than they had had the previous year, and was one of the toughest in the tournament. However, Tigres qualified for the next round, but only by goal-difference advantage, and after a last minute goal by Carlos Ramírez.

Because of its intensity, this group staged produced a lot of memorable games, particularly against Universidad Católica and against Corinthians at home and away. Tigres ended second in the group due to goal difference advantage, in a last minute goal against Universidad Católica, and so qualified again for play-offs.

In summary, Tigres played 8 games and produced 3 wins, 3 ties, and two defeats.

This performance at the beginning was considerably lacking, and it produced its first penalty kicks experience in Copa Libertadores.

On 5 August 2009, Tigres won the final of the 2009 North American SuperLiga against the Chicago Fire at their home stadium in the Chicago's suburb of Bridgeview, Illinois.

After finishing 3rd in the regular season of the Apertura 2011 Tournament, they returned after a 6-year absence to the 2012 Copa Libertadores, playing in the first stage. Tigres played home and away qualifying matches against Chile's Unión Española. They played the first match in Chile, on 25 January 2012 at 6:50pm local time (3:50pm CST). Unión Española took the first game by a score of 1–0, scoring at the 58th minute, after Tigres sent a reserve squad to play the match. They hosted their Chilean rival on 2 February 2012, at 8:00 pm CST. They tied 2–2 and failed to qualify for the Group Stage. Coach Ricardo Ferretti was criticized by the media and fans for sending a reserve squad to play the matches.

After the championship of the Apertura 2011, Tigres qualified for the first time to the CONCACAF Champions League. They lost in quarterfinals against Seattle Sounders FC by 1–0, 3–1, for an aggregate of 2–3. Ferretti was criticized again for sending a reserve squad to play the second match against the Sounders like he did in the Copa Libertadores.

==== Copa Libertadores 2015 ====

Copa Libertadores 2015 Finals starting line-up

By finishing the regular season of the Apertura 2014 as second place with 31 units, Tigres advanced to Copa Libertadores 2015 as Mexico 1 to play in Group 6 against River Plate, San José and Juan Aurich. On 18 February 2015, Tigres defeated Juan Aurich by 3–0 at the Estadio Universitario with two goals of Joffre Guerrón and one of Jesús Dueñas. On 5 March, with goal of Guerrón, Tigres tied 1–1 against River Plate at the Estadio Monumental. On 11 March, Tigres defeated San José by 1–0 with goal of Amaury Escoto at the Estadio Jesús Bermúdez. Tigres won by 4–0 against San José at the Estadio Universitario with two goals of Rafael Sóbis, and goals of Guerrón and Egidio Arévalo on 17 March. On 8 April, Tigres received River Plate for a high-profile match in the Estadio Universitario. River Plate needed to win or tie to remain in the fight for a ticket to the next phase. At 11' Egidio Arévalo scored the 1-0 for Tigres. The team kept the match under control and at 68' Damián Alvarez scored the 2–0. After a defensive mistake from José Rivas and Hugo Ayala, Teofilo Gutierrez scored the 1–2 at 86' for River Plate. Rodrigo Mora scored the 2–2 at the 89'. On 15 April, Tigres played against Juan Aurich at the Estadio Elías Aguirre.

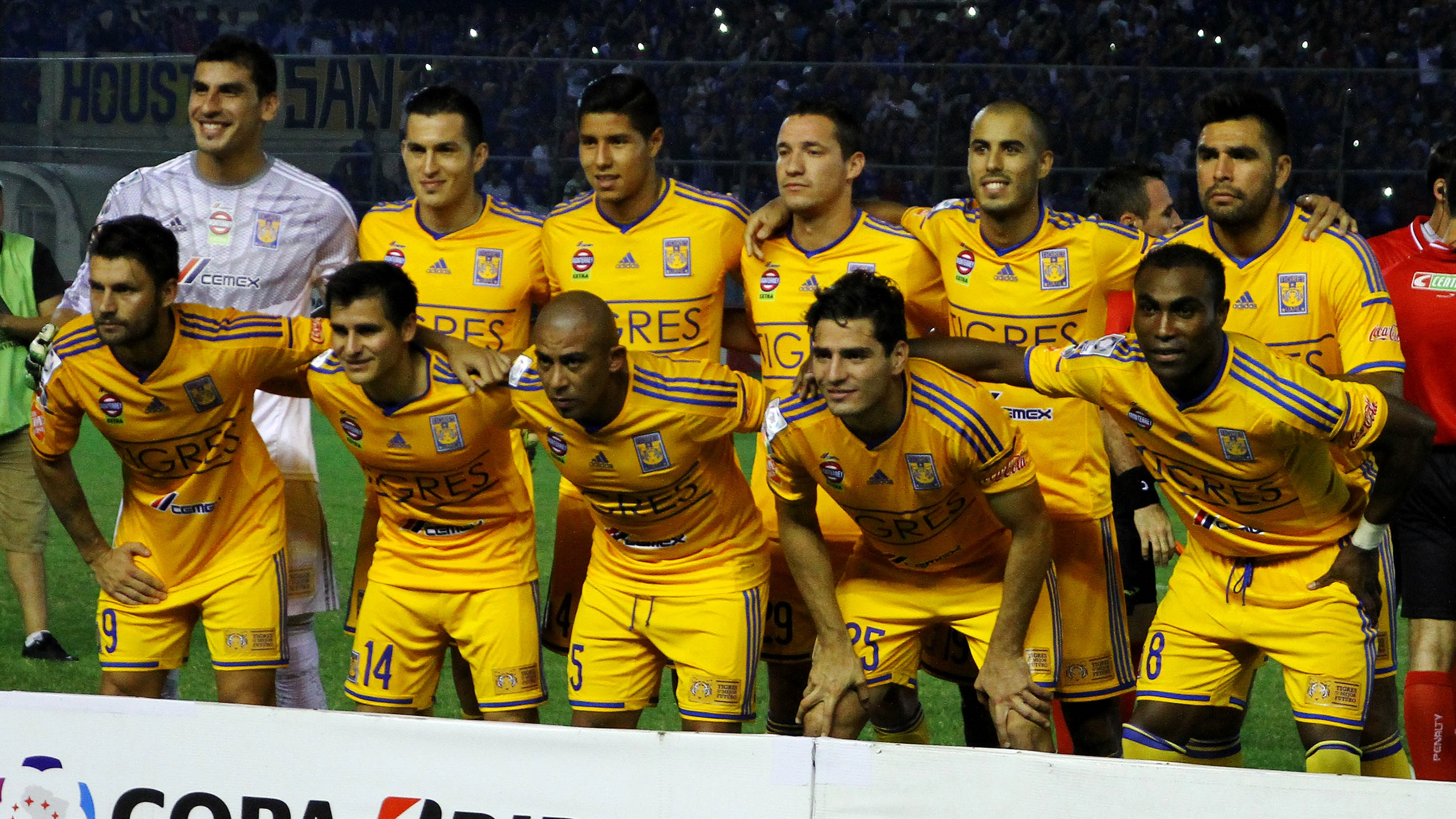
Tigres before the match against Emelec

Tigres, first place of the group and already qualified to the next phase, sent a reserve squad. The decision was heavily criticized by the Argentinian press, that stated that River Plate would not get to the second stage if Tigres lost against Juan Aurich. With a hat-trick of Enrique Esqueda, and goals of Dieter Villalpando and Jonathan Espericueta, Tigres won by 5–4, eliminating Juan Aurich. Tigres played the round of 16 against Universitario de Sucre. In the first leg, Tigres defeated Universitario by 2–1 with goals of Damián Álvarez and Enrique Esqueda. On 5 May, in the second leg, Tigres tied by 1–1 with goal of Sobis vía penalty-kick for an aggregate of 3-2 earning a ticket to quarterfinals. In the first leg of the quarterfinals, Tigres lost against Emelec by 1–0 at the Estadio Jocay. In the second leg at Estadio Universitario on 26 May, Tigres won by 2–0 with goals of Rafael Sóbis and José Rivas for an aggregate of 2-1 reaching semifinals against S.C. Internacional. On 15 July, Tigres lost the first leg of the semifinals at the Estádio Beira-Rio by 2–1 with goal of Hugo Ayala. In the second leg, on 22 July, Tigres defeated Internacional by 3–1 at the Estadio Universitario, with goals of André-Pierre Gignac, Egidio Arévalo and an own goal of Geferson. With an aggregate of 4–3, Tigres became the third Mexican team ever to reach the finals of the Copa Libertadores. On 29 July, in the first leg of the finals against River Plate, the teams tied by 0–0 at the Estadio Universitario. Tigres lost by 3–0 in the second leg at the Estadio Monumental on 5 August.

==== CONCACAF Champions League 2015–16 ====
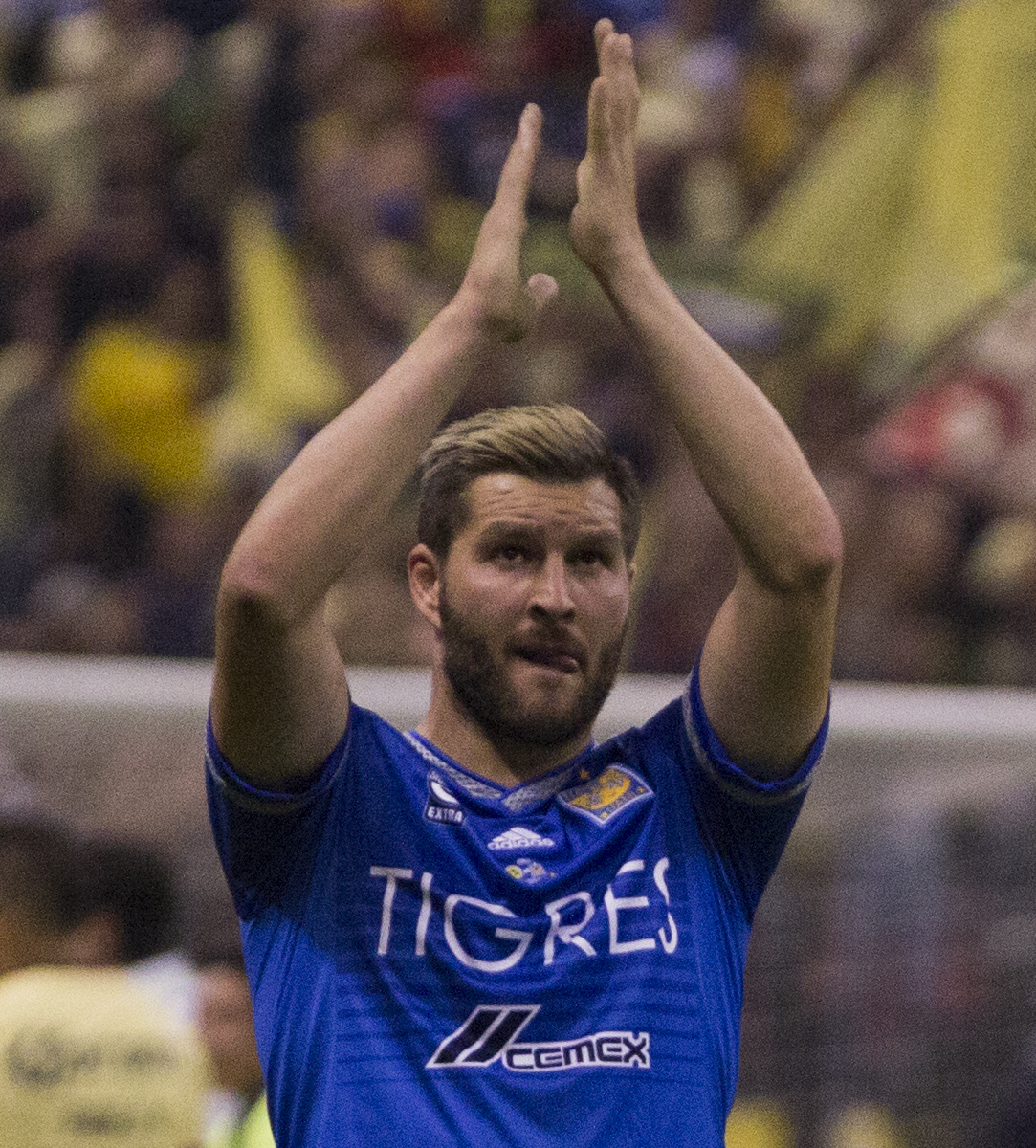
André-Pierre Gignac was of great importance in achieving the titles of Apertura 2015, Apertura 2016 and Apertura 2017.

As the runners-up of the Apertura 2014, Tigres qualified to the 2015–16 CONCACAF Champions League, playing their first match of the tournament on 18 August, only thirteen days after the second leg of the final of the 2015 Copa Libertadores. In the group stage, Tigres defeated A.D. Isidro Metapán at the Estadio Universitario by 2–1, tied by 1–1 against C.S. Herediano at the Estadio Eladio Rosabal Cordero, defeated Isidro Metapan by 2–1 at the Estadio Jorge Calero Suárez and tied at the Estadio Universitario against Herediano by 0–0, securing quarterfinals. Tigres defeated Real Salt Lake by 2–0 in the first leg of quarterfinals and tied 1–1 in the second leg, for an aggregate of 3–1. After a 0–0 draw in the first leg of semifinals against Querétaro, in the second leg Tigres won by 2–0. In the finals against Club América, Tigres fell by 0-2 the first leg at the Estadio Universitario and by 1–2 in the second leg at the Estadio Azteca for an aggregate of 1–4.

==== CONCACAF Champions League 2016–17 ====
As the champions of the 2015 Apertura, Tigres qualified to the 2016–17 CONCACAF Champions League. The team won the first match of the group stage against Herediano on 4 August 2016, by 3–1 at the Estadio Eladio Rosabal Cordero. The second match was also a victory by 3–1, this time against Plaza Amador on 17 August at the Estadio Universitario. The third match, against Plaza Amador, Tigres fell by 0–1 on 28 September at the Estadio Maracaná. In the last match of the group stage, Tigres won by 3–0 against Herediano at the Estadio Universitario. In the knockout stage, Tigres beat Pumas UNAM by 1–1 in the home leg and by 3–0 in the away leg. In semifinals, Tigres defeated Vancouver Whitecaps FC by 2–0 in the home leg and 2–1 in the away leg. Tigres lost the finals against Pachuca FC by 1–1 in the first leg and 0–1 in the second leg.

==== CONCACAF Champions League 2020 ====
UANL won the 2020 CONCACAF Champions League, defeating LAFC 2–1.

==== Campeones Cup ====
The team won the inaugural edition that was hosted by Toronto FC at BMO Field in Toronto on 19 September 2018. They would make their second appearance in the cup five years later, deafting LAFC on peanlties in 2023, becoming the first team in Campeones Cup history to win it more than once. As of 2023, Tigres are still the only Mexican side to have won the competition.

==== Leagues Cup ====
Tigres have made 2 appearances in Leagues Cup. They were invited to the inaugural edition in 2019 (this iteration had 8 only teams competing), making it to the final but losing to Cruz Azul. In 2023, as part of the expanded field of 47 teams (containing all clubs from Liga MX and MLS), Tigres were placed in the West 1 group with MLS sides Portland Timbers and San Jose Earthquakes. The club won both group matches and advanced to the knockout round, where they then defeated Vancouver Whitecaps in the round of 32 before ultimately falling to Monterrey in the round of 16 at Shell Energy Stadium in Houston in a match marred by late game controversy.

==== 2020 FIFA Club World Cup ====

2020 FIFA Club World Cup final line-up

By winning the 2020 CONCACAF Champions League, Tigres qualified for the 2020 FIFA Club World Cup in Qatar. In the first game, Tigres defeated Ulsan Hyundai by a 2–1 scoreline. Tigres won 1–0 in their semi-final fixture against Palmeiras, despite the efforts of goalkeeper Weverton. Tigres became the first CONCACAF team to reach a final in the FIFA Club World Cup, where they lost 1–0 to FC Bayern Munich. André-Pierre Gignac scored all of Tigres' three goals, finished as top goal scorer of the cup and achieved the Adidas Silver Ball for the Cup's second best player, behind Robert Lewandowski.

== Culture ==
=== Colours ===
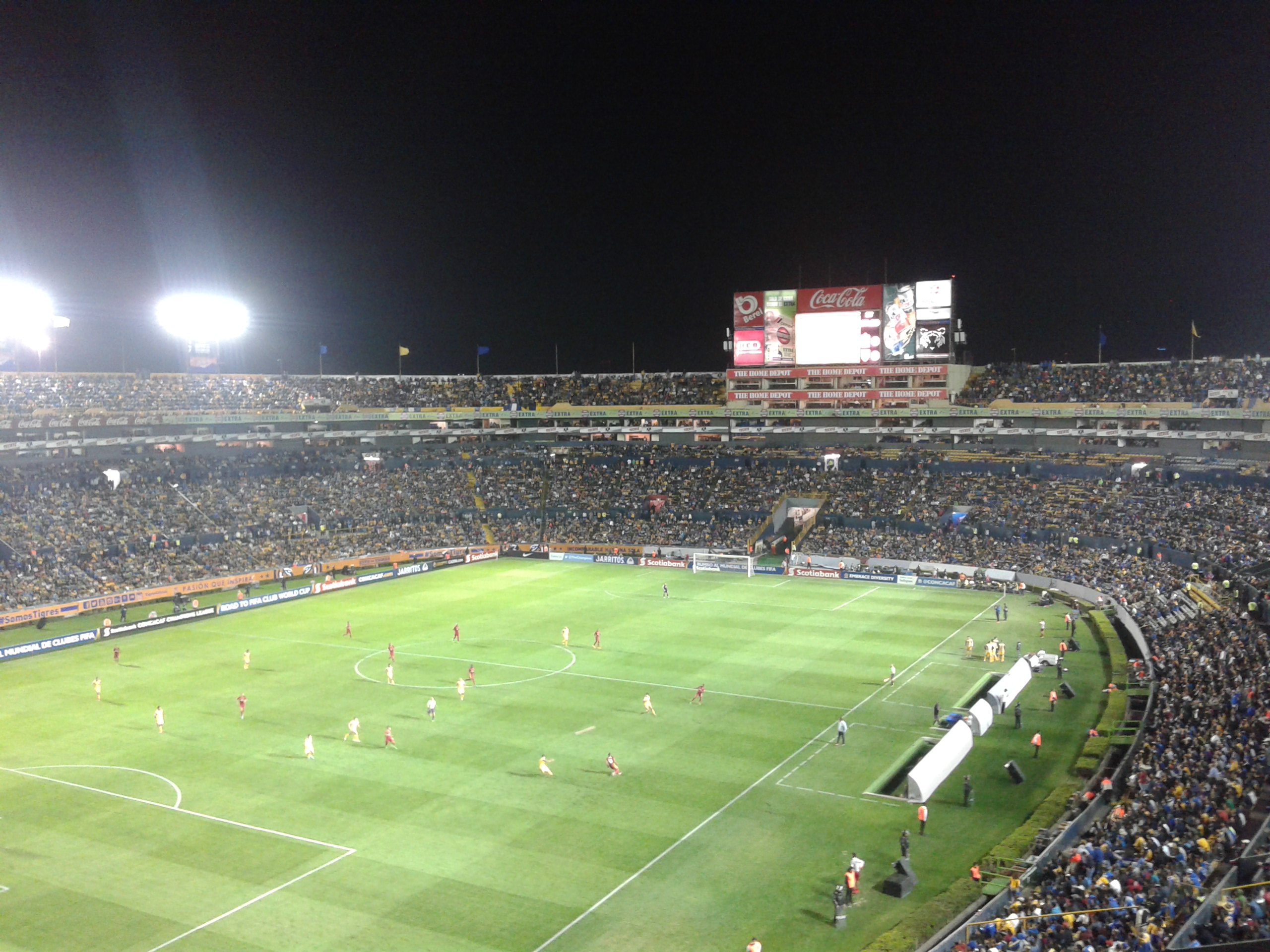
Estadio Universitario.

Since the foundation of the club in 1960, its distinctive colors are light gold and dark blue. In the home jersey, light gold is always predominant over dark blue, but in the away jersey, it is the opposite, the dark blue is predominant. The third colour has been inconsistent, sometimes presented as black, white, red, green, copper or dark gold.

=== Rivalry ===
Tigres' biggest rival is Monterrey. Their derby is called Clásico Regiomontano. On every Clásico the stadium is sold out as soon as tickets go on sale. It is known for being one of the most intense and competed derbies in Mexican football, and is widely regarded as the most important Mexican derby after the Clásico Nacional. Tigres and Monterrey played their first Clásico on 13 July 1974 at the Estadio Universitario, game that ended with a 3–3 draw. The teams played a historical final for the Liga MX championship of the Apertura 2017 season. In the first leg the teams tied by 1–1 at the Estadio Universitario. In the Estadio BBVA Bancomer, Tigres beat Monterrey by 2–1 with goals of Edu Vargas and Francisco Meza, winning the first league final between the two. In 2019, Tigres lost the final of the CONCACAF Champions League against Monterrey.

=== Fanbase ===
Tigres claims to have Mexico's most loyal supporting crowd. Every season Tigres play in front of a sold-out Estadio Universitario due to their over 39,000 season-ticket holders. Since the reactivation of the domestic cup (Copa MX) in 2012, the Estadio Universitario has registered a full attendance in the cup games as well. After getting relegated and made all of their games Local-PPV in 1996, fans continued their unwavering support during the year it took the club to achieve promotion back to Liga MX. It was the only team in the Ascenso MX that registered a full attendance for every home game during that entire year. Its fan base expands to other states such as Coahuila, Durango, San Luis Potosí, Tamaulipas, Veracruz and (like many other Liga MX teams) in the US, particularly Texas. Several Mexican sports media have ranked the Tigres' fans as the best in the Liga MX, citing their loyalty during the club's bad streaks. The fans, nicknamed "Incomparables" (Incomparable ones), are the best known travelling support group due to the thousands of members chanting for the team in the away games. Founded in 1998, Libres y Lokos are the biggest group of ultras of the club. On 9 March 2013, over 23,000 fans traveled to the city of San Luis Potosí to support the team in a game against San Luis FC at the Estadio Alfonso Lastras.

== Season to season ==
Season	Division	RK
1967–68	2nd Division	
1968–69	2nd Division	
1969–70	2nd Division	
1970–71	2nd Division	
1971–72	2nd Division	
1972–73	2nd Division	
1973–74	2nd Division	Champions
1974–75	Primera División (First Division)	13
1975–76	Primera División (First Division)	12
1976–77	Primera División (First Division)	19
1977–78	Primera División (First Division)	Champions
1978–79	Primera División (First Division)	2
1979–80	Primera División (First Division)	8
1980–81	Primera División (First Division)	11
1981–82	Primera División (First Division)	Champions
1982–83	Primera División (First Division)	9
1983–84	Primera División (First Division)	9
1984–85	Primera División (First Division)	12
Prode 85	Primera División (First Division)	19
Mexico 86	Primera División (First Division)	15

Season	Division	RK
1986–87	Primera División (First Division)	5
1987–88	Primera División (First Division)	15
1988–89	Primera División (First Division)	13
1989–90	Primera División (First Division)	6
1990–91	Primera División (First Division)	12
1991–92	Primera División (First Division)	11
1992–93	Primera División (First Division)	8
1993–94	Primera División (First Division)	17
1994–95	Primera División (First Division)	18
1995–96	Primera División (First Division)	Relegated
Invierno 1996	Primera A	Champions
Verano 1997	Primera A	Champions
Invierno 1997	Primera División (First Division)	15
Verano 1998	Primera División (First Division)	10
Invierno 1998	Primera División (First Division)	9
Verano 1999	Primera División (First Division)	10
Invierno 1999	Primera División (First Division)	9
Verano 2000	Primera División (First Division)	10
Invierno 2000	Primera División (First Division)	11
Verano 2001	Primera División (First Division)	4

Season	Division	RK
Invierno 2001	Primera División (First Division)	1
Verano 2002	Primera División (First Division)	9
Apertura 2002	Primera División (First Division)	12
Clausura 2003	Primera División (First Division)	4
Apertura 2003	Primera División (First Division)	1
Clausura 2004	Primera División (First Division)	12
Apertura 2004	Primera División (First Division)	8
Clausura 2005	Primera División (First Division)	9
Apertura 2005	Primera División (First Division)	8
Clausura 2006	Primera División (First Division)	12
Apertura 2006	Primera División (First Division)	16
Clausura 2007	Primera División (First Division)	8
Apertura 2007	Primera División (First Division)	16
Clausura 2008	Primera División (First Division)	13
Apertura 2008	Primera División (First Division)	6
Clausura 2009	Primera División (First Division)	16
Apertura 2009	Primera División (First Division)	10
Bicentenario 2010	Primera División (First Division)	15
Apertura 2010	Primera División (First Division)	9
Clausura 2011	Primera División (First Division)	1

Season	Division	RK
Apertura 2011	Primera División (First Division)	Champions
Clausura 2012	Primera División (First Division)	5
Apertura 2012	Primera División (First Division)	12
Clausura 2013	Primera División (First Division)	1
Apertura 2013	Primera División (First Division)	8
Clausura 2014	Primera División (First Division)	14
Apertura 2014	Primera División (First Division)	2
Clausura 2015	Primera División (First Division)	1
Apertura 2015	Primera División (First Division)	Champions
Clausura 2016	Primera División (First Division)	8
Apertura 2016	Primera División (First Division)	Champions
Clausura 2017	Primera División (First Division)	7
Apertura 2017	Primera División (First Division)	Champions
Clausura 2018	Primera División (First Division)	5
Apertura 2018	Primera División (First Division)	6
Clausura 2019	Primera División (First Division)	Champions
Apertura 2019	Primera División (First Division)	3
Clausura 2020*	Primera División (First Division)	7*
Apertura 2020	Primera División (First Division)	6

- Has played 70 Mexican Primera División Tournaments so far.
- Has played 7 2nd Division Tournaments, the last in 1974.
- Has played 2 Primera A Tournaments, the last in 1997.

=== Historic shields ===
2002–2012

== Honours ==
Domestic
Type	Competition	Titles	Seasons	Runners-up
Top level FMF	Liga MX	8	1977–78, 1981–82, Ape–2011, Ape–2015, Ape–2016, Ape–2017, Cla–2019, Cla–2023	1979–80, Inv–2001, Ape–2003, Ape–2014, Cla–2017, Ape–2023, Ape–2025
Top level FMF	Copa MX	3	1975–76, 1995–96, Cla–2014	1989–90
Top level FMF	Campeón de Campeones	4	2016, 2017, 2018, 2023	1976, 2019
Top level FMF	Supercopa MX	0	—	2014
Top level FMF	Supercopa de la Liga MX	0	—	2024
Lower levels FMF	Primera División A	2	Inv–1996, Ver–1997	—
Lower levels FMF	Campeón de Ascenso	1	1997	—
Lower levels FMF	Segunda División	1	1973–74	1971–72
International
Type	Competition	Titles	Seasons	Runners-up
Worldwide FIFA	FIFA Club World Cup	0	—	2020
Continental CONCACAF	CONCACAF Champions Cup	1	2020	2015–16, 2016–17, 2019, 2026
Continental CONMEBOL	CONMEBOL Libertadores	0	—	2015
Regional North America USSF–FMF	Leagues Cup	0	—	2019
Regional North America USSF–FMF	North American SuperLiga	1^{s}	2009	—
Regional North America USSF–FMF	Campeones Cup	2	2018, 2023	—

Notes

- record
- ^{s} shared record

== Personnel ==
=== Management ===
Position	Staff
Sporting Chairman	(Mexico) Carlos Emilio González
Sporting Vice President	(Mexico) Víctor Manuel Vucetich
President of the Sinergia Deportiva Liaison Sporting Council (CEMEX-UANL management joint venture)	(Mexico) Mauricio Doehner
Director of academy	(Spain) Julián Expósito

Source: Liga MX

=== Coaching staff ===
Position	Staff
Manager	(Mexico) Víctor Manuel Vucetich (interim)
Assistant managers	(Mexico) Carlos Barra
Assistant managers	(Mexico) Hernán Elizondo
Assistant managers	(Mexico) Carlos Turrubiates
Goalkeeper coach	(Mexico) Aarón Fernández
Fitness coach	(Uruguay) Jorge Graniolati
Physiotherapist	(Argentina) Jorge Raffetto
Team doctor	(Mexico) Gerardo Toledo

Source: Liga MX

== Players ==
=== First-team squad ===
As of 2 November 2026

Note: Flags indicate national team as defined under FIFA eligibility rules; some limited exceptions apply. Players may hold more than one non-FIFA nationality.

No.	Pos.	Nation	Player
1	GK	ARG	Nahuel Guzmán
2	DF	MEX	Francisco Reyes
3	DF	USA	Marco Farfan
5	MF	URU	César Araújo
6	MF	MEX	Juan Vigón
8	MF	URU	Fernando Gorriarán
9	FW	URU	Emiliano Gómez
11	MF	ARG	Juan Brunetta
13	GK	USA	Antonio Carrera
14	DF	MEX	Jesús Garza
15	DF	ARG	Alan Franco (on loan from São Paulo)
16	MF	MEX	Diego Lainez
17	FW	URU	Rodrigo Aguirre
19	MF	MEX	Mauro Lainez
20	MF	CAN	Marcelo Flores

No.	Pos.	Nation	Player
21	FW	MEX	Ricardo Monreal
22	FW	MEX	Guillermo Martínez
23	MF	BRA	Rômulo
25	GK	MEX	Carlos Felipe Rodríguez
26	DF	MEX	Fernando Ordóñez
27	DF	MEX	Jesús Alberto Angulo
28	DF	BRA	Joaquim
29	MF	USA	Jaidyn Contreras (on loan from FC Dallas)
30	MF	MEX	Diego Sánchez
32	DF	MEX	Vladimir Loroña
33	DF	MEX	Rafael Guerrero
34	MF	MEX	Henrique Simeone
35	DF	MEX	Osvaldo Rodríguez
77	MF	MEX	Ozziel Herrera

=== First-team squad ===
Note: Flags indicate national team as defined under FIFA eligibility rules; some limited exceptions apply. Players may hold more than one non-FIFA nationality.

No.	Pos.	Nation	Player
192	DF	MEX	Édgar Villavicencio
198	MF	MEX	Isac Galván

No.	Pos.	Nation	Player
200	FW	MEX	Diego Ramírez
205	FW	MEX	Antonio de María y Campos

=== Out on loan ===
Note: Flags indicate national team as defined under FIFA eligibility rules; some limited exceptions apply. Players may hold more than one non-FIFA nationality.

No. / Pos. / Nation / Player; — / DF / MEX / Juanjo Purata (at Atlas)	No. / Pos. / Nation / Player; — / MF / MEX / Eugenio Pizzuto (at Atlante)

=== Reserve teams ===
Tigres SD
Reserve team that plays in the Liga TDP, the fourth level of the Mexican league system.

== See also ==
- Football in Mexico
- List of world champion football clubs and vice-world champions in football
