= Apertura 2026 Liga MX final phase =

Apertura 2025 Liga MX final phase
Tournament details
- Dates: 25 November–13 December 2026
- Teams: 8

The Apertura 2026 Liga MX final phase will begin on 25 November 2026. A total of eight teams will compete in the final phase to decide the champions of the Apertura 2026 Liga MX season. For the first time since the Apertura 2019 season, the final phase will not feature a previous round before the liguilla, reducing the total number of participating teams to eight.

Should Toluca qualify to the final phase and advance to the final, the first leg would be played on 24 December and the second leg on 27 December, to accommodate their participation in the 2026 FIFA Intercontinental Cup.

== Qualified teams ==
The following teams qualified for the championship stage.

In the following tables, the number of appearances, last appearance, and previous best result count only those in the short tournament era starting from Invierno 1996 (not counting those in the long tournament era from 1943–44 to 1995–96).

Qualified directly to quarter-finals (8 teams)
Seed	Team	Points (GD)	Date of qualification	Appearance	Last appearance	Previous best (last)	Ref.
TBD	Cruz Azul	32	1 November 2026	40th	Clausura 2026	Champions (Cl. 2026)	
TBD	América	30	31 October 2026	43rd	Clausura 2026	Champions (Ap. 2024)	
TBD	Guadalajara	29	31 October 2026	36th	Clausura 2026	Champions (Cl. 2017)	
4	Atlas	27	6 November 2026	28th	Clausura 2026	Champions (Cl. 2022)	
5	Toluca	27	7 November 2026	42nd	Clausura 2026	Champions (Ap. 2025)	
6	Monterrey	27	21 November 2026	33rd	Apertura 2025	Champions (Ap. 2019)	
7	León	26	21 November 2026	19th	Clausura 2025	Champions (Gua. 2020)	
8	Pachuca	25	21 November 2026	44th	Clausura 2026	Champions (Ap. 2022)	
