= Ramiro, Valladolid =

Ramiro
- Municipality
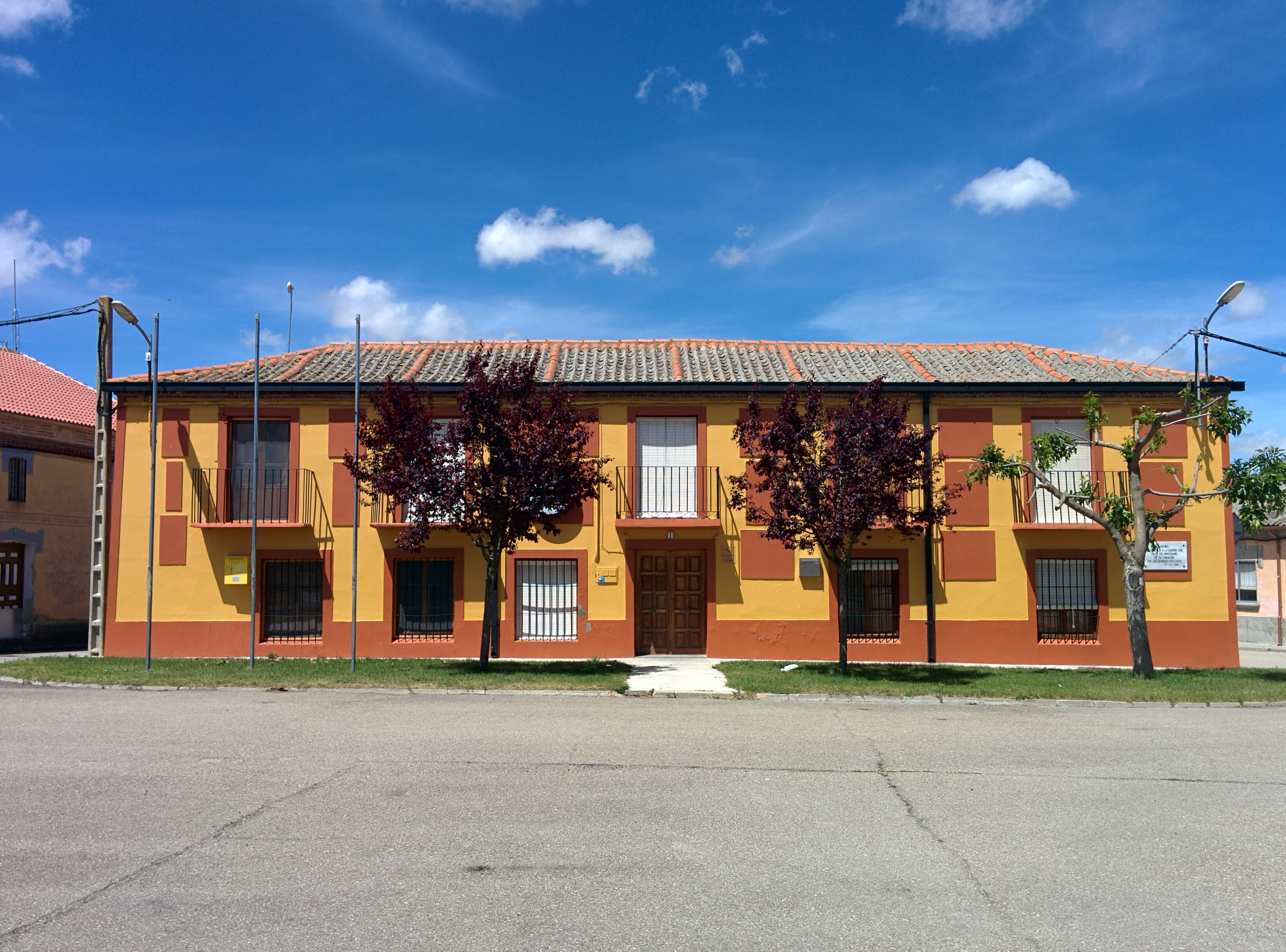
- Town hall

- Location in Spain
- Coordinates: 41°13′43″N 4°47′10″W
- Country: Spain
- Community: Castile and León
- Province: Valladolid

Area
  - Total: 21.20 km^{2} (8.19 sq mi)

Population (2025-01-01)
  - Total: 44
  - Density: 2.1/km^{2} (5.4/sq mi)
- Time zone: UTC+1 (CET)
  - Summer (DST): UTC+2 (CEST)

Ramiro is a municipality located in the province of Valladolid, Castile and León, Spain.
