= Ramiro Ortiz =

Nicaraguan businessman

Ramiro Ortiz Mayorga is a Nicaraguan businessman. He heads Grupo Promérica, one of the main corporate groups of Nicaragua. Considered one the wealthiest men of Nicaragua. He owns Banco de la Producción. He is the former owner of El Nuevo Diario newspaper. He is also a member of Washington D.C.–based think tank the Inter-American Dialogue.
