= Ramiro Garcés =

Ramiro Garcés may refer to:

- Ramiro Garcés of Viguera (died before 990), Navarrese royalty and sub-king in Viguera
- Ramiro Garcés, Lord of Calahorra (died 1083), Navarrese royalty and Castilian courtier
