= Carlos Ramírez (Mexican footballer) =

Mexican footballer (born 1976)

Personal information
- Full name: Carlos Alberto Ramírez Castillo
- Date of birth: 6 November 1976 (age 49)
- Place of birth: Mexico City, Mexico
- Height: 1.86 m (6 ft 1 in)
- Position: Forward

Senior career*
Years	Team	Apps	(Gls)
2003	Acapulco	2	(1)
2003–2005	Atlante	26	(6)
2006	Tigres UANL	4	(2)
2006	Pegaso Real de Colima	7	(1)
2007	Durango	6	(1)
2008–2009	Irapuato	25	(1)
- * Club domestic league appearances and goals as of 08:38, 2 November 2012 (PST)

Carlos Alberto Ramírez Castillo (born November 6, 1976) is a retired Mexican professional footballer. He lasted played for Deportivo Irapuato, wearing #13. He is nicknamed "Tin-Tan" because of an apparent physical likeness to the Mexican actor.

Carlos Participated in the 2012 FIFA Futsal World Cup with the Mexico national futsal team wearing # 9.

== Career ==
He debuted with Atlante F.C. in 2003 and played for that team until 2005, scoring 15 goals in 4 seasons. He then came to Tigres in 2006 as part of an agreement that the team made to sign Sebastián González.

In Tigres, Carlos Ramírez became the amulet of victory, for even though he has only scored two goals in one season, those have been of incredible importance for the team. On March 12, 2006, he scored the winning goal at the last minute of the 81st Clásico Regiomontano, and on April 19 he also scored the winning goal, again at the last minute, of the Tigres v. Universidad Católica match of the Copa Libertadores de América group stage that eliminated the Chilean team and had Tigres qualify for round of 16.

== Honours ==
=== Club ===
Irapuato

- Primera División A:
  - Runner Up (1) : Apertura 2008
