= Carlos Ramírez Sandoval =

Mexican museum director and curator

Carlos Ramirez Sandoval (4 November 1939 – 29 January 2016) was a Mexican museum director and curator.

He was born in Morelia in the state of Michoacán, Mexico. He studied at the National Autonomous University of Mexico (UNAM) as well as the San Carlos Academy (now known as the Escuela Nacional de Artes Plasticas). He later obtained his Ph.D. from the University of Paris.

He was part of Mexican cultural activities from the 1960s as a museographer, curator, administrator, teacher, writer and communicator among other positions. His major projects included installing some of the first exhibition galleries in the Academy of San Carlos, the overall plan and museography of the Museum of Technology of the Federal Electricity Commission (Comision Federal de Electricidad, C.F.E) in Mexico City of which he was the first director, setting up the "Coloquio de Invierno" along with Víctor Flores Olea and Javier Wimer (among others), as well as bringing together the group of artists who collaborated on the 'Espacio Escultorico' at the UNAM. He directed several museums and cultural centres including the defunct National Education Library, the Museum of Technology, and the Trotsky Museum which he helped revive and restore.

Following a prolonged battle with Parkinson's disease, Dr. Ramirez Sandoval died in Mexico City on 29 January 2016.
