= Victor Ramirez =

Victor Ramirez may refer to:

- Victor R. Ramirez (born 1974), American politician
- Vic Ramirez, baseball outfielder and manager; see 1992 Texas Rangers season
- Victor Emilio Ramírez (born 1984), Argentine boxer
