= Carlos Ramírez Ruiz =

Mexican politician

- Born: 24 February 1962 (age 64); Sinaloa, Mexico
- Occupation: Politician
- Political party: PRI

Carlos Ramírez Ruiz (born 24 February 1962) is a Mexican politician from the Institutional Revolutionary Party. In 2009 he served as Deputy of the LX Legislature of the Mexican Congress representing Sinaloa.
