= Reyna Haydee Ramírez =

Mexican journalist

- Born: Reyna Haydee Ramírez Hernández
- Occupation: Journalist
- Years active: c. 1994–present
- Organization: Red Sonora de Periodistas

Reyna Haydee Ramírez Hernández is a freelance investigative journalist who primarily reports on corruption, immigration, and human rights.

== Career ==
Reyna Haydee Ramírez Hernández has a bachelor's degree in Communication Sciences from the University of Sonora. She began her career c. 1994. She co-founded the Red Sonora de Periodistas (English: Sonora Network of Journalists), a group of journalists that focuses on ethical journalism. She wrote for El Imparcial in Hermosillo, Sonora, for five years, and for 20 years she was a correspondent in northwestern Mexico for Grupo Reforma.

From 1999 to 2017, Ramírez reported various issues in the area, including the pollution disaster caused by Grupo México to the Sonora and Bacanuchi Rivers, immigration at the Mexico–United States border, the 2009 Hermosillo daycare center fire, and the damage caused by Hurricane Odile in Los Cabos, Baja California Sur, in 2014.

According to Ramírez, every governor of Sonora since she began her career has asked the newspapers she has worked for to fire her. She has also received death threats. In 2010, she had to leave Sonora and seek refuge in Baja California Sur. In 2022, she temporarily left the country and sought refuge in Barcelona, Spain.

=== Presidential briefings ===
Ramírez says that Felipe Calderón's security detail physically assaulted her to prevent her from approaching him, and that Enrique Peña Nieto avoided speaking to the press and only approached reporters to provide updates.

Ramírez gained notoriety for the questions she asked Mexican presidents Andrés Manuel López Obrador and Claudia Sheinbaum during their morning press briefings, which began in 2018. Ramírez's questions have addressed corruption and human rights. In some instances, the presidents have responded with dismissive remarks, while she has faced online harassment on other occasions.

Ramírez registered to ask questions at the briefing after López Obrador said that freedom of speech would be guaranteed at them. She believes that at first there was a more open atmosphere, but over time it became a place where journalists were slandered and attacked. She recalls that she first experienced online harassment after asking about the Notimex strike in 2020. After she reported the matter to the president's office, she was asked to file a complaint with the prosecutor's office, which was subsequently dismissed. Ramírez believes that, under Sheinbaum's presidency, most of those who ask questions are aligned with the president and that, unlike in the past, she is now asked to submit her questions in advance.

López Obrador's government denied censoring or persecuting Ramírez, as did Sheinbaum.

== See also ==
- Freedom of the press in Mexico
