= Agustín Ramírez =

Agustín Ramírez may refer to:

- Agustín Ramírez (footballer) (born 2000), Argentine footballer
- Agustín Ramírez (singer) (1952–2022), Mexican singer
- Agustín Ramírez (baseball) (born 2001), Dominican baseball player
