= Ramiro Otero Lugones =

- Born: Ramiro Armando Otero Lugones; Sorata, Bolivia
- Died: 11 February 2013 (aged 84); Ciudad de La Paz, Bolivia
- Education: University of Chile, Santiago de Chile, Chile; Universidad Técnica de Oruro, Oruro, Bolivia; Higher University of San Andrés, La Paz, Bolivia
- Occupations: Lawyer, Activist
- Children: Zoia Martha Otero Valle; Maria Nadiezda Otero Valle

Ramiro Otero Lugones (9 November 1928 – 11 February 2013) was a Bolivian lawyer, docent and Human Rights defender.

He also worked as journalist for many newspapers and political magazines in different countries.
