= José Ramírez =

José Ramírez may refer to:

== Sportspeople ==
- José Luis Ramírez (born 1958), retired Mexican boxer
- José Ramírez Cubas (born 1962), Peruvian footballer and manager
- José Luis Ramírez (racing driver) (born 1979), NASCAR driver
- José Ramírez (footballer, born 1977), Argentine football goalkeeper
- José Ramírez (footballer, born 1982), Mexican footballer
- José Ramírez (footballer, born 1990), Colombian football defender
- José Ramírez (footballer, born 1996), Mexican footballer
- José Ramírez (pitcher) (born 1990), Dominican baseball pitcher
- Jose Ramirez (boxer) (born 1992), American boxer
- José Ramírez (third baseman) (born 1992), Dominican baseball infielder
- Jose Ramirez (American football) (born 1999), American football player
- José Ramírez (para-athlete), Colombian para-athlete

== Music ==
- José Ramírez (luthier) (1858–1923), luthier
- José Ramírez III (1922–1995), luthier and grandson of José Ramírez (luthier)
- José Agustín Ramírez Altamirano (1903–1957), Mexican composer

== Others ==
- José Agustín Ramírez Gómez (1944–2024), Mexican writer (published as "José Agustín")
- José Fernando Ramírez (1804–1871), Mexican historian
- José Santos Ramírez (1790–1851), Argentine soldier
- José Ramírez de Arellano (c.1705–1770), Spanish architect and sculptor
- José Ramírez Gamero (1938–2022), Mexican politician, Governor of Durango
