= Hernán Elizondo =

Mexican footballer (born 1976)

Personal information
- Full name: Hernán Rodrigo Elizondo González
- Date of birth: 3 July 1976 (age 50)
- Place of birth: Monterrey, Nuevo León, Mexico
- Height: 1.82 m (5 ft 11 1/2 in)
- Position: Defender

Team information
- Current team: UANL U-21 (head coach)

Senior career*
Years	Team	Apps	(Gls)
2000–2001	Atlante	11	(0)
2002	Atlético Celaya	0	(0)
2003	Correcaminos UAT	10	(0)
2004	Celaya	2	(0)
2004–2005	Correcaminos UAT	26	(0)

Managerial career
- 2011–2016: Tigres UANL Reserves and Academy
- 2016–2018: Tigres UANL Premier
- 2018–: Tigres UANL Reserves and Academy
- 2026: Tigres UANL (interim)
- * Club domestic league appearances and goals

Hernán Rodrigo Elizondo González (born July 3, 1976) is a Mexican former football player. Since July 28, 2026 is the interim coach of Liga MX team Tigres UANL, club where he normally works as an academy coach.
