= Ramiro Saavedra =

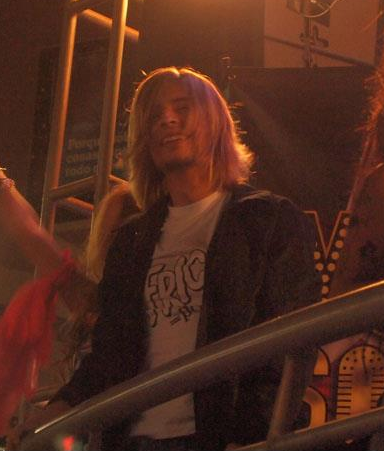

Background information
- Born: Ramiro Saavedra Linares; 14 March 1984 (age 42); Arequipa, Peru
- Occupation: Singer
- Instruments: Vocals, guitar
- Years active: (2003–present)

Ramiro Saavedra Linares (born 14 March 1984) is a Peruvian singer, best known for his artistic name "Corco Bain". He was the winner of imitation and singing reality television series Yo soy (I Am), which characterized grunge singer Kurt Cobain.

== Musical career ==
Saavedra formed, in 2007, the alternative rock band Olaf, in Arequipa, Peru, in which he is vocalist and guitarist. The setlist of cover songs that his band plays include singles from Oasis, Pearl Jam, R.E.M., Bon Jovi, Guns N' Roses and Nirvana. In Arequipa, Ramiro has opened concerts for bands like Mägo de Oz and Soul Asylum.

In April 2012, after getting through his audition, he began his participation in the singing competition and imitation Yo soy (first season) of Frecuencia Latina characterizing Cobain. His first appearance on the program was Trending topic on Twitter, and media from other countries also highlighted the video of his audition. The American site The Huffington Post rated his imitation as "almost perfect". He was later interviewed by the BBC London.

After two and a half months of competition, Saavedra was the winner of the last episode. He told the press that he will soon start recording his new album with his band.
