= Ramiro Martinez Jr. =

American criminologist

- Born: 1962 (age 63–64); San Antonio, Texas
- Education: Ohio State University (Ph.D., 1992)
- Scientific career
- Fields: Criminology
- Workplaces: Northeastern University

Ramiro Martinez Jr. (born 1962) is an American criminologist. He is a professor at Northeastern University, in both the School of Criminology and Criminal Justice and the Department of Sociology and Anthropology.

== Career ==
He is also the chair of the American Sociological Association's Section on Crime, Law, and Deviance. He was born in San Antonio, Texas, and taught at Florida International University before joining Northeastern. In 2006, while on sabbatical from Florida International University, he became a visiting scholar at the University of Houston's Center for Mexican American Studies. His research focuses on variations in crime across ecological areas, and across racial and immigrant groups. This research includes multiple studies showing that immigration from Mexico to the United States is associated with lower crime rates.
