= Carlos Ramírez Suárez =

Spanish lawyer from Gran Canaria (1902–1978)

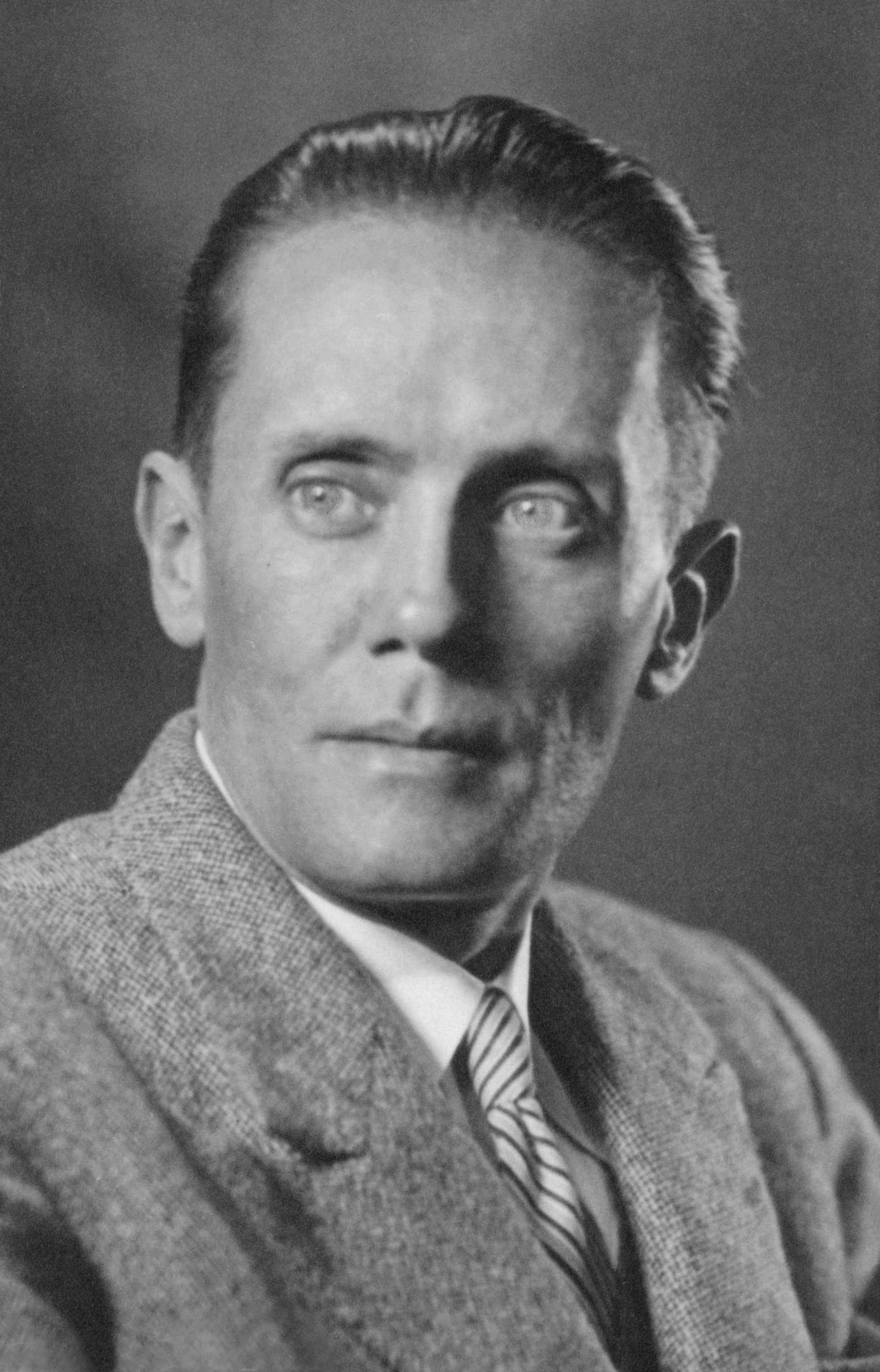
Carlos Ramírez Suárez

Carlos Ramírez Suárez (July 3, 1902 – August 30, 1978) was a Spanish lawyer, writer and chronicler of the island of Gran Canaria.

== Early life and education ==
Ramírez Suárez was the fourth son of lawyer and journalist Rafael Ramirez Doreste and his wife Dolores Suárez King, and went to school at the college of Pedro Quevedo, in Castle Street Las Palmas de Gran Canaria, and high school at the Colegio San Agustin in the same city.

== Higher education ==
Ramírez Suárez studied at the Central University of Madrid to obtain a law degree. During his time as an undergraduate, he attended the Library of Ateneo de Madrid, where he gave a lecture in 1923 on "D. Benito Perez Galdos and Canary Islands ". While there, he formed a close friendship with Carlo Thousands Augustine, a relationship he maintained throughout his life. In law school he showed a predilection for the criminal branch, and was guided by jurist and professor Luis Jiménez de Asúa.

== Works ==
- Scraps of professional ethics (1956)
- Simulated legal transactions (1955)
- Contracts trust in modern law (1954)
- Study historical, legal and jurisprudential irrigation water in Canary Islands (1962)
- Pulse of Glory (1975)
- In the path of my memories (1976)
