= Ramiro Martinez (sportscaster) =

Cuban sportscaster (1923–2015)

Ramiro Martinez (August 23, 1923 – July 8, 2015) was a Cuban born sportscaster who settled in Puerto Rico, where he hosted, at various times, television and radio shows. Martinez was elected to the Puerto Rican Sports Hall of Fame in 2009.

== Biography ==
Ramiro Martinez left Cuba in 1945 and moved to New York, New York, where he began broadcasting Major League Baseball games to a number of Hispanic countries. At that era, he worked alongside Argentine baseball commentator and friend Eloy Canel. During this period also, he authored columns for 12 newspapers and 3 magazines. In 1955, Ramirez established himself in Puerto Rico (some unreferenced sources claim he lived in Spain first). Martinez had started his professional career in Cuba not as a sportscaster but as an actor.

In Puerto Rico, Martinez quickly began working as a sportscaster and reporter. He began to work there on a radio show that lasted for 50 years. Martinez, who did not openly oppose Fidel Castro, as a reporter was able to interview the Cuban President and El Che Guevara live and in person.

Martinez met Roberto Clemente in 1954, as the future baseball Hall-of-Famer played triple-A baseball. The two forged a friendship that lasted until Clemente died in a plane crash on December 31, 1972. Both Martinez and Clemente considered each other to be brothers. Years later, Martinez also forged a strong friendship with boxer Wilfredo Gómez.

Martinez had a weekly, Sunday evening television show on Puerto Rico's Canal 2, named "De Todo un Poco con Ramiro Martinez" ("A Little Bit of Everything, With Ramiro Martinez") in which he commented about the week's sports news, and instructed the viewers about different sports, including baseball-his favorite sport-, boxing-his second favorite one-, Olympic sports and others. Martinez later became sportscaster for the Miami Marlins's radio transmissions.

Ramiro Martinez was also an avid sports memorabilia collector. His three-floor home in Guaynabo, Puerto Rico held what is considered to be the largest sports memorabilia collection in the tiny country, including 5,000 items related to Clemente. In 1973, Martinez released an album dedicated to Clemente's memory. This album was relaunched in 2004 as a compact disc. Martinez also had the largest sports-event-related video collection in Puerto Rico.

Martinez was also an amateur magician; he showed his talents at a Silverio Perez television show, "En Serio con Silverio", during 1988.

== Death ==
Martinez, who had recently undergone surgery to repair an injury caused by a fall, died in his home in Guaynabo, Puerto Rico, on July 8, 2015.

== Personal life ==
Ramiro Martinez had two sons and two daughters. Ramiro Jr., Jorge, Fe and Sarah Martinez.
