= 2026 Louisville City FC season =

Season of a professional football team

Louisville City FC
2026 season
- Owner: John Neace
- Manager: Danny Cruz; Until March 17; Simon Bird; Interim, since March 17
- Stadium: Lynn Family Stadium
- USLC: TBD
- U.S. Open Cup: Round of 16
- USLC Playoffs: TBD
- USL Cup: Champions
Home colors	Away colors

The 2026 Louisville City FC season is the club's twelfth season of competition. Louisville City competes in the USL Championship, the second tier of professional soccer in the United States.

Early onto the season, Louisville City underwent a notable coaching change. Danny Cruz, who had been the head coach of Louisville since 2021, left the club to join MLS club Minnesota United FC as an assistant coach. In replacement, his head assistant coach Simon Bird took over the reins.

== Background ==
The 2025 Louisville City season was the most dominant season in USL Championship history, with Louisville only losing one match the entire season. Despite this, Louisville City suffered a disappointing upset at home during the 2025 USL Championship playoffs, being eliminated at home by eighth seeded Detroit City FC.

== Players and staff ==
=== Current roster ===
As of March 11, 2026

Note: Flags indicate national team as defined under FIFA eligibility rules; some limited exceptions apply. Players may hold more than one non-FIFA nationality.

No.	Pos.	Nation	Player
1	GK	FRA	Hugo Fauroux
2	DF	USA	Aiden McFadden
3	DF	USA	Jake Morris
4	DF	USA	Sean Totsch
5	DF	USA	Brandon Dayes
6	MF	AUS	Zach Duncan
7	FW	USA	Ray Serrano
9	FW	USA	Chris Donovan
12	GK	USA	Danny Faundez
13	DF	USA	Amadou Dia
14	FW	ENG	Tola Showunmi
15	DF	USA	Manny Perez
16	MF	USA	Carlos Moguel Jr.

No.	Pos.	Nation	Player
17	MF	USA	Taylor Davila
19	MF	SEN	Babacar Niang
21	FW	FRA	Quenzi Huerman
23	FW	ENG	Sam Gleadle
24	DF	USA	Josh Jones
25	FW	USA	Jansen Wilson
27	MF	USA	Evan Davila
28	MF	USA	Cameron Duke
30	GK	USA	Ryan Troutman
31	MF	JAM	Kevon Lambert
32	DF	NZL	Kyle Adams
47	FW	USA	Mukwelle Akale
97	FW	USA	Thomas Weinrich

=== Technical staff ===
- (England) Simon Bird – Interim Head Coach
- (United States) Paolo DelPiccolo – Assistant Coach
- (United States) Scott Budnick – Goalkeeping Coach

== Competitions ==
=== USL Championship ===
==== Standings — Eastern Conference ====
Pos	Team	Pld	W	L	T	GF	GA	GD	Pts	Qualification
5	Rhode Island FC (Q)	28	12	11	5	40	30	+10	41	Playoffs
6	Hartford Athletic (Q)	28	9	6	13	31	29	+2	40	Playoffs
7	Louisville City FC (Q)	27	11	9	7	45	42	+3	40	Playoffs
8	Miami FC	29	9	11	9	38	47	−9	36	Playoffs
9	Indy Eleven	28	9	12	7	34	36	−2	34	

Updated to match(es) played on October 14, 2026. Source: USL Championship Standings
(Q) Qualified for the phase indicated

==== Results summary ====
On December 16, 2025, the USL Championship released the schedule for all 25 teams for both the regular season and the USL Cup.

All times in regular season on Eastern Daylight Time (UTC-04:00) unless otherwise noted

==== Match results ====
March 6 1	Lexington SC	1–2	Louisville City FC	Lexington, Kentucky
7:30 PM	Molloy 18'	Report	Akale 52'; McFadden 85'	Stadium: Lexington SC Stadium; Attendance: 8,277; Referee: Elton García

March 14 2	Louisville City FC	4–1	Miami FC	Louisville, Kentucky
4:00 PM	McFadden 8'; Serrano 28'; Chris Donovan 30'; Wilson 68'	Report	Milesi 44'	Stadium: Lynn Family Stadium; Attendance: 9,009; Referee: Joshua Encarnación

March 21 3	Louisville City FC	4–2	Rhode Island FC	Louisville, Kentucky
4:00 PM	Morris 23'; Duncan 48'; Adams 76'; Wilson 90+2'	Report	Kwizera 21'; Holstad 56'; Williams (red card) 88'	Stadium: Lynn Family Stadium; Attendance: 8,121; Referee: Jeremy Scheer

March 28 4	Brooklyn FC	0–1	Louisville City FC	Brooklyn, New York
7:30 PM		Report	Vancaeyezeele 60' (o.g.)	Stadium: Maimonides Park; Attendance: 1,776

April 4 5	Louisville City FC	0–2	Charleston Battery	Louisville, Kentucky
4:00 PM		Report	Kissiedou 20'; Pakhomov 65'	Stadium: Lynn Family Stadium; Attendance: 7,297; Referee: Elvis Osmanovic

April 10 6	Loudoun United FC	3–3	Louisville City FC	Leesburg, Virginia
6:30 PM	Úlfarsson 8', 45'; Akinyode 61'	Report	Dayes 20'; Showunmi 26'; Davila 72'	Stadium: Segra Field; Attendance: 1,287; Referee: Igor Bych

April 18 7	Louisville City FC	1–0	Sporting Club Jacksonville	Louisville, Kentucky
5:00 PM	Wilson 90+6'	Report		Stadium: Lynn Family Stadium; Attendance: 11,182; Referee: Muhammad Kaleia

May 2 8	Detroit City FC	2–1	Louisville City FC	Hamtramck, Michigan
6:00 PM	Moguel 38' (o.g.); Rutz 71'	Report	Wilson 45+2'	Stadium: Keyworth Stadium; Attendance: 6,110; Referee: Natalie Simon

May 9 9	Louisville City FC	0–2	Pittsburgh Riverhounds SC	Louisville, Kentucky
7:00 PM		Report	Amann 9'; Bassett 52'	Stadium: Lynn Family Stadium; Attendance: 9,847; Referee: Brandon Stevis

May 23 10	Miami FC	4–3	Louisville City FC	Miami, Florida
7:00 PM	Calfo (yellow card) 13'; Locadia 20', 29', 83'; Musto (yellow card) 60'; Adams 72' (o.g.); Room (yellow card) 86'; Milesi (yellow card) 90'		Donovan 41', 89'; McFadden (yellow card) 57'; Showunmi 82'	Stadium: Pitbull Stadium; Referee: Mark Verso

May 30 11	Louisville City FC	0–2	Tampa Bay Rowdies	Louisville, Kentucky
7:00 PM	Duncan (yellow card) 28'; Adams (yellow card) 52'		Cruz (yellow card) 43'; Myers 76'; Schneider (yellow card) 86', (goal) 90+4'; Micaletto (yellow card) 90+3'	Stadium: Lynn Family Stadium; Attendance: 10,108; Referee: Nabil Bensalah

June 3 12	Birmingham Legion FC	1–1	Louisville City FC	Birmingham, Alabama
8:00 PM				Stadium: Protective Stadium

June 10 13	Phoenix Rising FC	0–2	Louisville City FC	Phoenix, Arizona
10:30 PM				Stadium: Phoenix Rising Soccer Stadium

June 13 14	Louisville City FC	2–2	Brooklyn FC	Louisville, Kentucky
8:00 PM	Donovan 30'; Serrano Lopez 89'	Report	Anderson 4', (red card) 90+7'; Stojanovic 55'	Stadium: Lynn Family Stadium; Attendance: 8,672; Referee: Erick Lezama

July 4 15	Louisville City FC	1–0	Hartford Athletic	Louisville, Kentucky
8:00 PM	Wilson 67'	Report		Stadium: Lynn Family Stadium; Attendance: 10,572; Referee: Atahan Yaya

July 18 16	Pittsburgh Riverhounds SC	3–1	Louisville City FC	Pittsburgh, Pennsylvania
12:00 PM	Amann 47', 48', 50'	Report	Wilson 68' (pen.)	Stadium: Highmark Stadium; Attendance: 4,757; Referee: Cristian Campo Hernández
Note: Trevor Amann's hat trick was the fastest hat trick in USL history.

July 29 17	Louisville City FC	2–1	Birmingham Legion FC	Louisville, Kentucky
7:30 PM	Lambert 6', 74'	Report	Shashoua 42'	Stadium: Lynn Family Stadium; Attendance: 8,258; Referee: Jeremy Scheer

August 1 18	Tampa Bay Rowdies	5–4	Louisville City FC	St. Petersburg, Florida
7:30 PM	Cicerone 48', 86'; Micaletto 51'; Myers 54', 89'	Report	Wilson 21'; Donovan 25'; Morris 29', 63'	Stadium: Al Lang Stadium; Attendance: 5,859; Referee: Elton García

August 8 19	Louisville City FC	1–1	San Antonio FC	Louisville, Kentucky
8:00 PM	Akale 12'	Report	Parano 78'	Stadium: Lynn Family Stadium; Attendance: 12,358; Referee: Rodrigo Albuquerque

August 15 20	Orange County SC	2–3	Louisville City FC	Irvine, California
10:00 PM	Sylla 70'; Bazini 81' (pen.)	Report	Serrano Lopez 6', 48'; Donovan 68'	Stadium: Championship Soccer Stadium; Attendance: 3,923; Referee: Trevor Wiseman

August 22 21	Indy Eleven	2–1	Louisville City FC	Indianapolis, Indiana
7:00 PM	Rendón 31'; Blake 60'	Report	Adams 58'	Stadium: Carroll Stadium; Attendance: 9,542; Referee: Muhammad Hassan

August 29 22	Louisville City FC	0–0	Detroit City FC	Louisville, Kentucky
8:00 PM		Report		Stadium: Lynn Family Stadium; Attendance: 10,082; Referee: Abdou Ndiaye

September 5 23	Rhode Island FC	1–1	Louisville City FC	Pawtucket, Rhode Island
7:30 PM	Korzeniowski 48'	Report	Totsch 18' (pen.)	Stadium: Centreville Bank Stadium; Attendance: 8,474; Referee: John Matto

September 12 24	Louisville City FC	1–2	El Paso Locomotive FC	Louisville, Kentucky
7:00 PM	Perez 77'	Report	Méndez 24' (pen.); Rubín 45'	Stadium: Lynn Family Stadium; Attendance: 8,834; Referee: Matthew Corrigan

September 19 25	Louisville City FC	2–1	Loudoun United FC	Louisville, Kentucky
7:00 PM	Serrano Lopez 38'; Donovan 45'	Report	Davis 5'	Stadium: Lynn Family Stadium; Attendance: 9,528; Referee: Nabil Bensalah

September 25 26	Hartford Athletic	2–2	Louisville City FC	Hartford, Connecticut
7:00 PM	Williams 11' (pen.); Fischer (yellow card) 50' (yellow-red card) 51'; Ngalina 73' (pen.)	Report	Morris 48'; Huerman 53' (pen.)	Stadium: Trinity Health Stadium; Attendance: 3,339; Referee: Mark Verso

October 3 27	Sporting Club Jacksonville	Postponed	Louisville City FC	Jacksonville, Florida
5:00 PM		Report		Stadium: Hodges Stadium
Note: Match rescheduled due to Louisville City FC advancing to the USL Cup Final.

October 10 28	Charleston Battery	0–2	Louisville City FC	Mt. Pleasant, South Carolina
6:00 PM		Report	Wilson 51'; Akale 88'	Stadium: Patriots Point Soccer Complex; Attendance: 4,316; Referee: Gerald Flores

October 17 29	Louisville City FC	4–1	Indy Eleven	Louisville, Kentucky
7:00 PM	Serrano Lopez 7', 43', 51'; Lambert 33'	Report	Rasheed 71'	Stadium: Lynn Family Stadium; Attendance: 10,328; Referee: Joe Surgan

October 21 27	Sporting Club Jacksonville	–	Louisville City FC	Jacksonville, Florida
5:00 PM				Stadium: Hodges Stadium

October 24 30	Louisville City FC	–	Detroit City FC	Louisville, Kentucky
7:00 PM				Stadium: Lynn Family Stadium

=== USL Cup ===
Louisville City participated in the third edition of the USL Cup, the second edition to feature teams from both the USL Championship and League One.

==== Standings ====
Pos	Lg	Team	Pld	W	PKW	PKL	L	GF	GA	GD	Pts	Qualification
1	USLC	Louisville City FC	4	3	1	0	0	12	4	+8	11	Advance to knockout stage
2	USLC	Detroit City FC	4	2	0	2	0	4	2	+2	8	
3	USLC	Indy Eleven	4	1	2	0	1	5	4	+1	7	
4	USL1	Union Omaha	4	2	0	0	2	10	12	−2	6	
5	USLC	Lexington SC	4	1	1	1	1	7	7	0	6	

==== Group stage ====
April 25	Louisville City FC	3–1	Fort Wayne FC	Louisville, Kentucky
7:00 PM	Duncan 8'; Serrano 76'; Adams 81'	Report	Ricol 5'	Stadium: Lynn Family Stadium; Attendance: 8,876; Referee: Thomas Snyder

May 17	Union Omaha	1–5	Louisville City FC	Omaha, Nebraska
5:00 PM	Diego 40'; Boudadi (red card)	Report	Wilson 27', 49'; Donovan 72', 83'; Huerman 87'	Stadium: Morrison Stadium; Attendance: 2,041; Referee: Trevor Wiseman

June 20	Detroit City FC	0–0 (3–4 p)	Louisville City FC	Hamtramck, Michigan
4:00 PM				Stadium: Keyworth Stadium; Attendance: 7,051; Referee: Matthew Corrigan
	Penalties
	Morris (penalty scored); Stanley (penalty scored); Williams (penalty scored); Rodriguez (penalty missed)		(penalty scored) Totsch; (penalty scored) Davila; (penalty scored) Moguel; (penalty scored) Huerman

July 11	Louisville City FC	4–2	Lexington SC	Louisville, Kentucky
8:00 PM	Wilson 28', 59'; Donovan 34'; Brown 73' (o.g.)	Report	Rodrigues 12'; Zengue 43'	Stadium: Lynn Family Stadium; Attendance: 9,487; Referee: Joshua Encarnacion

==== Knockouts ====
August 12 Quarter-finals	Tampa Bay Rowdies	0–0 (3–5 p)	Louisville City FC	Tampa, Florida
7:00 PM		Report		Stadium: Al Lang Stadium; Attendance: 2,287; Referee: Joshua Encarnación
	Penalties
	Dolabella (penalty scored); Schneider (penalty scored); Nigro (penalty missed); Hilton (penalty scored)		(penalty scored) Totsch; (penalty scored) Donovan; (penalty scored) E. Davila; (penalty scored) Huerman; (penalty scored) T. Davila

September 8 Semi-finals	San Antonio FC	0–0 (7–8 p)	Louisville City FC	San Antonio, Texas
8:30 PM		Report		Stadium: Toyota Field; Attendance: 4,757; Referee: Brad Jensen
	Penalties
	Taintor (penalty missed); Maldonado (penalty scored); Cuello (penalty scored); Ricol (penalty scored); Hernández (penalty scored); Parano (penalty missed); Barbir (penalty scored); Ward (penalty scored); Crognale (penalty scored); Haakenson (penalty missed)		(penalty missed) Totsch; (penalty scored) E. Davila; (penalty scored) Wilson; (penalty scored) Huerman; (penalty scored) T. Davila; (penalty missed) McFadden; (penalty scored) Morris; (penalty scored) Showunmi; (penalty scored) Dayes; (penalty scored) Dia

October 4 Finals	Hartford Athletic	0–1	Louisville City FC	Hartford, Connecticut
3:00 PM		Report	McFadden 12'	Stadium: Trinity Health Stadium; Attendance: 6,179; Referee: Elton García

=== U.S. Open Cup ===
By qualifying for the 2025 USL Championship playoffs, Louisville City qualified to play in a compacted US Open Cup format for the 2026 season, entering the tournament at home against amateur club Southern Indiana FC of the United Premier Soccer League. Following a comfortable victory at home, Louisville City were matched up in a Commonwealth Cup derby away in Lexington against fellow USL Championship club Lexington SC.

After winning away in Lexington, Louisville City were matched up against first-division club Austin FC of Major League Soccer at home. Despite being the lower-division club, Louisville City managed to achieve an upset against the MLS club. Following their Round of 32 victory, Lou City were matched up away against another MLS club, the Houston Dynamo FC, who they'd eventually lose to in added extra time.

March 18 Round 1	(Kentucky) Louisville City FC (USLC)	2–0	(Indiana) Southern Indiana FC (UPSL)	Louisville, Kentucky
7:00 PM ET	Showunmi 20', 30'	Report		Stadium: Lynn Family Stadium; Attendance: 1,780; Referee: Salvador Flores

April 1 Round 2	(Kentucky) Lexington SC (USLC)	0–2	(Kentucky) Louisville City FC (USLC)	Lexington, Kentucky
7:00 PM ET		Report	Niang 23'; Showunmi 51'	Stadium: Lexington SC Stadium; Attendance: 4,406; Referee: Amin Hadzic

April 14 Round of 32	(Kentucky) Louisville City FC (USLC)	2–1	(Texas) Austin FC (MLS)	Louisville, Kentucky
7:00 PM ET	Totsch 26'; Showunmi 32'	Report	Fodrey 70'	Stadium: Lynn Family Stadium; Attendance: 6,023; Referee: Calin Radosav

April 29 Round of 16	Houston Dynamo FC (Texas)	2–1 (a.e.t.)	(Kentucky) Louisville City FC	Houston, Texas
8:00 PM ET	Sviatchenko 89'; Ponce 101'	Report	Serrano 67'	Stadium: Shell Energy Stadium; Referee: Marcos de Oliveira
