= 2026 in American soccer =

Soccer in the United States
- Season: 2026

Men's soccer
- Supporters' Shield: Nashville SC
- USL Championship: Sacramento Republic FC
- TLfC: Pensacola
- NPSL: El Farolito
- USL League Two: Vermont Green
- US Open Cup: St. Louis City SC
- National Amateur Cup: El Farolito

Women's soccer
- NWSL: Kansas City Current
- NWSL Shield: Gotham FC
- 2025–26 USLS: Lexington SC
- WPSL: KC Current II
- NWSL Challenge Cup: Gotham FC
- National Amateur Cup: Rochester Lazers

The 2026 season is the 114th season of competitive soccer in the United States. The United States will co-host the 2026 FIFA World Cup with Mexico and Canada as the premier soccer event of the year.

The season begins with friendlies for the USWNT in January. and with friendlies for the USMNT in March to help prepare for the 2026 FIFA World Cup.

At the club international level, qualifying MLS clubs are competing in the 2026 CONCACAF Champions Cup, and qualifying NWSL clubs are competing in the 2025–26 CONCACAF W Champions Cup semi-finals.

== National teams ==
=== Men's ===
==== Senior ====
As of Novembe 17, 2026.

| Wins | Losses | Draws |
|---|---|---|
| 10 | 5 | 0 |

===== Friendlies =====
| March 28 | United States | 2–5 | Belgium | Atlanta, Georgia |
| 15:30 ET | McKennie 39'; Agyemang 87' | Report | DeBast 45'; Onana 53'; De Ketelaere 59' (pen.); Lukébakio 68', 82' | Stadium: Mercedes-Benz Stadium; Attendance: 66,867; Referee: Esteban Ostojich (Uruguay) |

| March 31 | United States | 0–2 | Portugal | Atlanta, Georgia |
| 19:00 ET | | Report | Trincão 37'; Félix 59' | Stadium: Mercedes-Benz Stadium; Attendance: 72,297; Referee: Sven Jablonski (Germany) |

| May 31 | United States | 3–2 | Senegal | Charlotte, North Carolina |
| 15:30 ET | Dest 7'; Pulisic 20'; Balogun 63' | Report | Mané 44', 52' | Stadium: Bank of America Stadium; Attendance: 57,741; Referee: Nick Walsh (Scotland) |

| June 6 | United States | 1–2 | Germany | Chicago, Illinois |
| 14:30 ET | Robinson 37' | Report | Havertz 2'; Sané 57' | Stadium: Soldier Field; Attendance: 63,636; Referee: Piero Maza (Chile) |

| September 26 | United States | 4–1 | Peru | Orlando, Florida |
| 16:30 ET | Ellis 4'; Tillman 66' (pen.); Hall 72'; Berhalter 90' | Report | Lapadula 15' | Stadium: Inter.co Stadium; Attendance: 24,228; Referee: Steffon Dewar (Jamaica) |

| September 29 | United States | 4–2 | Chile | St. Louis, Missouri |
| | Berhalter 37'; Hall 51'; Richards 72'; Albert 90+3' | Report | Ulloa 45+1'; Gutiérrez 49' | Stadium: Energizer Park; Attendance: 21,680; Referee: Jorge Camacho (Mexico) |

| October 3 | United States | 3–0 | Mexico | Glendale, Arizona |
| | Hall 38'; Sullivan 62'; Tillman 84' | Report | | Stadium: State Farm Stadium; Attendance: 64,932; Referee: Selvin Brown (Honduras) |

| October 6 | United States | 1–0 | Canada | St. Paul, Minnesota |
| 20:00 ET | Ellis 29' | Report | | Stadium: Allianz Field; Attendance: 19,182; Referee: Steven Madrigal (Costa Rica) |

| December 13 | United States | v | Jamaica | Fort Lauderdale, Florida |
| 15:30 ET | | | | Stadium: Inter Miami CF Stadium |

===== 2026 FIFA World Cup =====
====== Group D ======
| Pos | Team | Pld | W | D | L | GF | GA | GD | Pts | Qualification |
|---|---|---|---|---|---|---|---|---|---|---|
| 1 | United States (H) | 3 | 2 | 0 | 1 | 8 | 4 | +4 | 6 | Advance to knockout stage |
| 2 | Australia | 3 | 1 | 1 | 1 | 2 | 2 | 0 | 4 (Note: Tied on head-to-head result (Paraguay 0–0 Australia). Overall goal difference was used as the tiebreaker.) | Advance to knockout stage |
| 3 | Paraguay | 3 | 1 | 1 | 1 | 2 | 4 | −2 | 4 | Advance to knockout stage |
| 4 | Turkey | 3 | 1 | 0 | 2 | 3 | 5 | −2 | 3 | |

Source: FIFA
(H) Hosts
Notes:

| June 12 | United States | 4–1 | Paraguay | Inglewood, California |
| 21:00 ET | Bobadilla 7' (o.g.); Balogun 31', 45+5'; Reyna 90+8' | Report | Maurício 73' | Stadium: SoFi Stadium; Attendance: 70,492; Referee: Danny Makkelie (Netherlands) |

| June 19 | United States | 2–0 | Australia | Seattle, Washington |
| 15:00 ET | Burgess 11' (o.g.); Freeman 43' | Report | | Stadium: Lumen Field; Attendance: 66,925; Referee: Felix Zwayer (Germany) |

| June 25 | Turkey | 3–2 | United States | Inglewood, California |
| 22:00 ET | Güler 10'; Yılmaz 31'; Ayhan 90+8' | Report | Trusty 3'; Berhalter 49' | Stadium: SoFi Stadium; Attendance: 70,492; Referee: Mustapha Ghorbal (Algeria) |

====== Knockout stage ======
| July 1 Round of 32 | United States | 2–0 | Bosnia and Herzegovina | Santa Clara, California |
| | Balogun 45'; Tillman 82' | Report | | Stadium: Levi's Stadium; Referee: Raphael Claus (Brazil) |

| July 6 Round of 16 | United States | 1–4 | Belgium | Seattle, Washington |
| | Tillman 31' | Report | De Ketelare 9', 33'; Vanaken 57'; Lukaku 90+3' | Stadium: Lumen Field; Attendance: 66,925; Referee: Adham Makhadmeh (Jordan) |

===== 2026–27 CONCACAF Nations League =====
====== League A ======
Quarterfinals

| Team 1 | Agg. | Team 2 | 1st leg | 2nd leg |
|---|---|---|---|---|
| Haiti | 0–8 | United States | 0–6 | 0–2 |

| November 14 First leg | Haiti | 0–6 | United States | Miami, Florida |
| 16:30 ET | | Report | Trusty 10'; Hall 52'; Pulisic 62' (pen.), 63'; McKennie 68'; Balogun 82' | Stadium: Nu Stadium; Attendance: 21,597; Referee: Walter López (Guatemala) |

| November 17 Second leg | United States | 2–0 | Haiti | Cincinnati, Ohio |
| 19:00 ET | | Report | Pulisic 25'; Hall 43' | Stadium: TQL Stadium; Attendance: 24,001; Referee: Oshane Nation (Jamaica) |

===== Goalscorers =====
| Player | Goals |
|---|---|
| Folarin Balogun | 5 |
| Julian Hall | 5 |
| Christian Pulisic | 4 |
| Malik Tillman | 4 |
| Sebastian Berhalter | 3 |
| Justin Ellis | 2 |
| Weston McKennie | 2 |
| Auston Trusty | 2 |
| Patrick Agyemang | 1 |
| Mathis Albert | 1 |
| Sergiño Dest | 1 |
| Alex Freeman | 1 |
| Giovanni Reyna | 1 |
| Chris Richards | 1 |
| Antonee Robinson | 1 |
| Cavan Sullivan | 1 |
| own goal | 2 |
| Total | 37 |

==== U–20 ====
===== Friendlies =====
| March 27 Friendly | Argentina | 0–3 | United States | Ezeiza, Argentina |
| 10:00 EDT | | Report | Olivas; Swan; Darboe | Stadium: Predio Deportivo Lionel Andrés Messi; Attendance: 0 |

| June 5 Friendly | Georgia | 0–1 | United States | Blagoevgrad, Bulgaria |
| | | Report | Jamison | Stadium: Stadion Hristo Botev |

| June 8 Friendly | North Macedonia | 0–2 | United States | Blagoevgrad, Bulgaria |
| | | Report | Klapija; Medina | Stadium: Stadion Hristo Botev |

===== CONCACAF U-20 Championship =====
====== Group A ======
| Pos | Team | Pld | W | D | L | GF | GA | GD | Pts | Qualification |
|---|---|---|---|---|---|---|---|---|---|---|
| 1 | United States | 3 | 3 | 0 | 0 | 11 | 0 | +11 | 9 | Knockout stage |
| 2 | Haiti | 3 | 2 | 0 | 1 | 5 | 6 | −1 | 6 | Knockout stage |
| 3 | Cuba | 3 | 1 | 0 | 2 | 5 | 8 | −3 | 3 | |
| 4 | El Salvador | 3 | 0 | 0 | 3 | 1 | 8 | −7 | 0 | |

Source: CONCACAF
Rules for classification: Tiebreakers

| July 25 | United States | 3–0 | Haiti | Puebla, Mexico |
| 21:00 EST | Klapija 38'; Ramos 62' (pen.); Morales 89' (pen.) | Report | | Stadium: Estadio Universitario BUAP; Referee: Michael Venne (Canada) |

| July 28 | El Salvador | 0–3 | United States | Puebla, Mexico |
| 21:00 EST | | Report | Klapija 35' (pen.); Ramos 61' (pen.); Cupps 89' | Stadium: Estadio Universitario BUAP; Referee: Félix Mojica (Nicaragua) |

| July 31 | United States | 5–0 | Cuba | Puebla, Mexico |
| 21:00 EST | Ramos 2'; Shaw 26'; Dayes 75'; Torquato 78'; Vanney 82' | Report | | Stadium: Estadio Universitario BUAP; Referee: Jorge Leira (Panama) |

====== Knockout stage ======
| August 4 Quarterfinals | United States | 3–1 | Guatemala | Puebla, Mexico |
| 20:00 | Dayes 45+5'; Klapija 68'; Torquato 75' | Report | De León 36' | Stadium: Estadio Cuauhtémoc; Referee: Shavin Greene (Guyana) |

| August 7 Semifinals | Costa Rica | 0–2 | United States | Mexico City, Mexico |
| 20:00 | | Report | Ramos Jr 37'; Applewhite 77' | Stadium: Estadio Banorte |

| August 9 Final | United States | 0–2 | Mexico | Mexico City, Mexico |
| 17:00 | | Report | Alfaro 28', 69' | Stadium: Estadio Banorte; Referee: Adonis Carrasco (Dominican Republic) |

==== U–17 ====
===== Friendlies =====
| March 28 Friendly | Paraguay | 3–3 | United States | Ypané, Paraguay |
| | | | | Stadium: Centro de Alto Rendimiento de Futbol Femenino; Attendance: 0 |

| June 7 Friendly | Brazil | 4–0 | United States | Natal, Brazil |
| | Rodrigo; Beni; Kauê; Pape | Report | | Stadium: Arena das Dunas |

| June 10 Friendly | Brazil | 1–0 | United States | Natal, Brazil |
| | Pape | Report | | Stadium: Arena das Dunas |

| September 30 Friendly | Republic of Ireland | 1–1 | United States | Puerto Banús, Spain |
| | Murphy 74' | Report | Cadigan 14' | Stadium: Banús Football Center |

| October 1 Friendly | Belgium | 4-1 | United States | Puerto Banús, Spain |
| | | Report | Lucero | Stadium: Banús Football Center |

| October 6 Friendly | Netherlands | 2–2 | United States | Puerto Banús, Spain |
| | | Report | | Stadium: La Quinta Football Center |

===== CONCACAF U-17 World Cup qualification =====
====== Group E ======
| Pos | Team | Pld | W | D | L | GF | GA | GD | Pts | Qualification |
|---|---|---|---|---|---|---|---|---|---|---|
| 1 | United States | 3 | 2 | 1 | 0 | 19 | 1 | +18 | 7 | 2026 FIFA U-17 World Cup |
| 2 | Dominican Republic | 3 | 2 | 1 | 0 | 16 | 1 | +15 | 7 | |
| 3 | Saint Kitts and Nevis | 3 | 0 | 1 | 2 | 2 | 17 | −15 | 1 | |
| 4 | Saint Vincent and the Grenadines (H) | 3 | 0 | 1 | 2 | 2 | 20 | −18 | 1 | |

Source: CONCACAF
Rules for classification: Tiebreakers
(H) Hosts

| February 5 2026 CONCACAF U-17 World Cup qualification | United States | 8–0 | Saint Vincent and the Grenadines | Arnos Vale, Saint Vincent and the Grenadines |
| 6:00 pm ET | Medina 6', 28', 37'; Peterson 15' (o.g.); Sokoloff 61', 66'; Jakupovic 71', 87' | Report | | Stadium: Arnos Vale Stadium; Attendance: 375; Referee: Michah Erskine (Guyana) |

| February 7 2026 CONCACAF U-17 World Cup qualification | Saint Kitts and Nevis | 0–10 | United States | Arnos Vale, Saint Vincent and the Grenadines |
| 7:00 pm ET | | Report | Jakupovic 7', 23', 44', 80' (pen.), 84'; Garcia 36' (pen.); Dimareli 58' (pen.), 72'; Chadwick 69'; Forfor 90' | Stadium: Arnos Vale Stadium; Attendance: 250; Referee: Renlee Napoleon (Saint Lucia) |

| February 10 2026 CONCACAF U-17 World Cup qualification | United States | 1–1 | Dominican Republic | Arnos Vale, Saint Vincent and the Grenadines |
| 1:00 pm ET | Jakupovic 41' | Report | Garcia 44' | Stadium: Arnos Vale Stadium; Attendance: 210; Referee: Jonathan Leiton (Costa Rica) |

===== FIFA U-17 Men's World Cup =====
====== Group J ======
| November 21 | United States | Withdrew | Montenegro | Al Rayyan, Qatar |
| 9:30 EST | | Report | | Stadium: Aspire Zone |

| November 24 | United States | Withdrew | Chile | Al Rayyan, Qatar |
| 9:30 EST | | Report | | Stadium: Aspire Zone |

| November 27 | Algeria | Withdrew | United States | Al Rayyan, Qatar |
| 11:00 EST | | Report | | Stadium: Aspire Zone |

Note

Team withdrew on 11 November 2026, citing security concerns.

=== Women's ===
==== Senior ====
As of October 13, 2026.

| Wins | Losses | Draws |
|---|---|---|
| 8 | 3 | 1 |

===== Friendlies =====
| January 24 | United States | 6–0 | Paraguay | Carson, California |
| | Turner 45+3'; Sentnor 47', 57'; Martínez 53' (o.g.); Rodman 56'; Sears 72' | Report | | Stadium: Dignity Health Sports Park; Attendance: 19,397; Referee: Marianela Araya (Costa Rica) |

| January 27 | United States | 5–0 | Chile | Santa Barbara, California |
| | Bethune 18'; Joseph 26'; Sams 33'; Sears 46'; Rodman 68' | Report | | Stadium: Harder Stadium; Attendance: 14,797; Referee: Timothy Derry (Trinidad and Tobago) |

| April 11 | United States | 2–1 | Japan | San Jose, California |
| 17:30 ET | Lavelle 9'; Heaps 48' | Report | Ueki 61' | Stadium: PayPal Park; Attendance: 17,435; Referee: Karen Andrade (Mexico) |

| April 14 | United States | 0–1 | Japan | Seattle, Washington |
| 22:00 ET | | Report | Maika Hamano 27' | Stadium: Lumen Field; Attendance: 36,128; Referee: Janeishka Caban (Puerto Rico) |

| April 17 | United States | 3–0 | Japan | Commerce City, Colorado |
| 21:00 ET | Girma 47'; Lavelle 56'; Wesley 64' | Report | | Stadium: DICK’S Sporting Goods Park; Attendance: 17,589; Referee: Myriam Marcotte (Canada) |

| June 6 | Brazil | 2–1 | United States | São Paulo, Brazil |
| 17:30 ET | Maranhão 11'; Zaneratto 14' | Report | Wilson 2' | Stadium: Neo Química Arena; Attendance: 31,336; Referee: María Eugenia Gil Soriano (Spain) |

| June 9 | Brazil | 0–1 | United States | Fortaleza, Brazil |
| 20:30 ET | | Report | Isabela 63' (o.g.) | Stadium: Arena Castelão; Attendance: 55,744; Referee: Paola Cebollada Lopez (Spain) |

| October 10 | United States | 0–2 | Spain | Washington, D.C. |
| 14:30 ET | | Report | Guijarro 3'; Navarro 14' | Stadium: Audi Field; Attendance: 19,220; Referee: Eugenia Gil Soriano (Spain) |

| October 13 | United States | 2–2 | Spain | Chester, Pennsylvania |
| 19:00 ET | Sanchez 49'; Swanson 86' | Report | Putellas 27'; Paralluelo 32' | Stadium: Subaru Park; Attendance: 18,648; Referee: Myriam Marcotte (Canada) |

===== SheBelieves Cup =====
| Pos | Team | Pld | W | PW | PL | L | GF | GA | GD | Pts |
|---|---|---|---|---|---|---|---|---|---|---|
| 1st place, gold medalist(s) | United States (C, H) | 3 | 3 | 0 | 0 | 0 | 4 | 0 | +4 | 9 |
| 2nd place, silver medalist(s) | Canada | 3 | 1 | 1 | 0 | 1 | 4 | 2 | +2 | 5 |
| 3rd place, bronze medalist(s) | Colombia | 3 | 1 | 0 | 0 | 2 | 2 | 5 | −3 | 3 |
| 4 | Argentina | 3 | 0 | 0 | 1 | 2 | 0 | 3 | −3 | 1 |

Source: ESPN
Rules for classification: 1) points; 2) goal difference; 3) goals scored; 4) head-to-head result; 5) fair play ranking.
(C) Champion; (H) Host

| March 1 | United States | 2–0 | Argentina | Nashville, Tennessee |
| 17:00 ET | Heaps 20'; Shaw 56' | Report | | Stadium: Geodis Park; Attendance: 17,125; Referee: Timothy Derry (Trinidad and Tobago) |

| March 4 | United States | 1–0 | Canada | Columbus, Ohio |
| 18:45 ET | Sentnor 55' | Report | | Stadium: ScottsMiracle-Gro Field; Attendance: 18,545; Referee: Lizzet Garcia (Mexico) |

| March 7 | United States | 1–0 | Colombia | Harrison, New Jersey |
| 15:30 ET | A. Thompson 82' | Report | | Stadium: Sports Illustrated Stadium; Attendance: 22,385; Referee: Vimarest Diaz (Dominican Republic) |

===== CONCACAF W Championship =====
| November 27 QF | United States | v | El Salvador | Mansfield, Texas |
| 20:30 ET | | Report | | Stadium: Texas Health Mansfield Stadium |

===== Goalscorers =====
| Player | Goals |
|---|---|
| Ally Sentnor | 3 |
| Lindsey Heaps | 2 |
| Rose Lavelle | 2 |
| Trinity Rodman | 2 |
| Emma Sears | 2 |
| Croix Bethune | 1 |
| Naomi Girma | 1 |
| Jameese Joseph | 1 |
| Emily Sams | 1 |
| Ashley Sanchez | 1 |
| Jaedyn Shaw | 1 |
| Mallory Swanson | 1 |
| Alyssa Thompson | 1 |
| Reilyn Turner | 1 |
| Kennedy Wesley | 1 |
| Sophia Wilson | 1 |
| own goal | 2 |
| Total | 24 |

==== U–20 ====
===== Friendlies =====
| April 11 friendly | United States | 2–0 | Brazil | Kansas City, Missouri |
| | Ullmark 24'; Ascanio 76' | Report | | Stadium: CPKC Stadium; Attendance: 1,600; Referee: Matt Feringer (United States) |

| April 15 friendly | United States | 1–1 | Brazil | Kansas City, Missouri |
| | Ascanio 24' | Report | Vitorinha 15' | Stadium: Riverside Stadium; Attendance: 300; Referee: Drew Klemp (United States) |

| June 5 friendly | United States | 5–0 | Spain | Algeciras, Spain |
| | Ullmark 3', 45+1', 49'; Barcenas 79'; Buck 90' | Report | | Stadium: Estadio Nuevo Mirador; Referee: Ildefonso Enrique Cozar Andrades (Spain) |

| June 8 friendly | United States | 2–1 | France | Algeciras, Spain |
| | Johnson 66'; Adames 80' | Report | Oillic 56' | Stadium: Estadio Nuevo Mirador; Referee: Patricia Luna Varo (Spain) |

| July 9 friendly | United States | 1–1 | England | Fayetteville, Georgia |
| | | | | Stadium: U.S. Soccer National Training Center |

| July 12 friendly | United States | 0–1 | Colombia | Fayetteville, Georgia |
| | | Report | Silva 22' | Stadium: U.S. Soccer National Training Center; Referee: Justin Higgins (United States) |

===== FIFA U-20 Women's World Cup =====
====== Group D ======
| Pos | Team | Pld | W | D | L | GF | GA | GD | Pts | Qualification |
|---|---|---|---|---|---|---|---|---|---|---|
| 1 | Italy | 3 | 2 | 1 | 0 | 6 | 2 | +4 | 7 | Knockout stage |
| 2 | Japan | 3 | 1 | 2 | 0 | 5 | 4 | +1 | 5 | Knockout stage |
| 3 | United States | 3 | 1 | 1 | 1 | 12 | 4 | +8 | 4 | Knockout stage |
| 4 | New Zealand | 3 | 0 | 0 | 3 | 1 | 14 | −13 | 0 | |

Source: FIFA
Rules for classification: Group stage tiebreakers

| September 6 2026 FWWC GS | United States | 1–2 | Italy | Łódź, Poland |
| 12:00 pm ET | M. Johnson 18' | Report | Fadda 40'; Pellegrino Cimò 59' | Stadium: Stadion Miejski LKS; Attendance: 258; Referee: Casey Reibelt (Australia) |

| September 9 2026 FWWC GS | Japan | 2–2 | United States | Łódź, Poland |
| 12:00 pm ET | Tago 74'; Nakamura 83' | Report | McCammon 35'; Buck 75' | Stadium: Stadion Miejski LKS; Attendance: 718; Referee: Marta Huerta (Spain) |

| September 12 2026 FWWC GS | New Zealand | 0–9 | United States | Sosnowiec, Poland |
| 12:00 pm ET | | Report | Buck 4', 58'; Fuller 6', 83', 90+2' (pen.); M. Johnson 38'; Ullmark 43'; Adames 60'; Strawn 87' | Stadium: Arena Sosnowiec; Attendance: 375; Referee: Anahí Fernández (Uruguay) |

====== Knockout stage ======
| September 16 2026 FWWC R16 | Brazil | 1–1 (a.e.t.) (5–4 p) | United States | Katowice, Poland |
| | Sofia Couto 59' | Report | McCammon 63' | Stadium: Arena Katowice; Attendance: 273; Referee: Silvia Gasperotti (Italy) |
| | Penalties |
| | Brendha (penalty scored); Gisele (penalty scored); Emilly Lucas (penalty scored); Aninha (penalty scored); Bianca (penalty scored) | | (penalty missed) Adames; (penalty scored) McCammon; (penalty scored) Nguyen; (penalty scored) Joseph; (penalty scored) Alvarez |

==== U–17 ====
===== Friendlies =====
| January 11 friendly | Germany | 2–2 | United States | La Nucia, Alicante, Spain |
| | Choisy 46'; Kuhn 76' | Report | Stanislaus 25'; Manning 41' | Stadium: Club Deportivo Sporting Fútbol Sala La Nucia |

| January 14 friendly | Denmark | 0–3 | United States | La Nucia, Spain |
| | | Report | Ahrens 47'; Paletta 83'; Sanislaus 89' | Stadium: Camilo Cano Stadium |

| February 9 MIMA Cup – First Round | Wales | 0–5 | United States | San Pedro del Pinatar, Spain |
| | | Report | Morrell 24', 56'; Paletta 45+3'; Manning 59'; Aguilar 81' | Stadium: Pinatar Arena; Attendance: 70; Referee: Andrea Firvida |

| February 12 MIMA Cup – Semi–finals | Morocco | 0–5 | United States | San Pedro del Pinatar, Spain |
| | | Report | Ahrens 67'; Paletta 71'; DiMaria 75', 83', 87' | Stadium: Pinatar Arena; Attendance: 80; Referee: Pedro Segura (SPA) |

| February 14 MIMA Cup – Final | England | Canceled | United States | San Pedro del Pinatar, Spain |
| | | | | Stadium: Pinatar Arena |

| July 3 Friendly | Japan | 5–3 | United States | Chiba, Japan |
| | Higuchi 10'; Hanashiro 47'; Ito 50'; Matsushita 51'; Hanashiro 67' | Report | DiMaria 12'; DiMaria 14'; Whitham 90+4' | Stadium: Prince Takamado Memorial JFA YUME Field; Attendance: 120; Referee: Misa Chiba (Japan) |

| July 6 Friendly | Japan | 2–1 | United States | Chiba, Japan |
| | Williams 69' (o.g.); Hanashiro 74' | Report | Hanf 22' | Stadium: Prince Takamado Memorial JFA YUME Field; Attendance: 90; Referee: Yurina Tazawa (Japan) |

| August 13 friendlies | United States | 1–1 | Mexico | Fayetteville, Georgia |
| | Manning 59' | Report | Carmona 67' | Stadium: U.S. Soccer National Training Center; Referee: Lila Remache (USA) |

| August 17 friendlies | United States | 1–0 | Chile | Fayetteville, Georgia |
| | Stanislaus 65' | Report | | Stadium: U.S. Soccer National Training Center; Referee: Christopher Haggerty (USA) |

| August 20 friendlies | United States | 4–1 | Canada | Fayetteville, Georgia |
| | Manning 4'; DiMaria 39', 41', 55' | Report | Hennessy 9' | Stadium: U.S. Soccer National Training Center; Referee: Robert Benge (USA) |

===== CONCACAF Women's U-17 Championship =====
====== Group B ======
| Pos | Team | Pld | W | D | L | GF | GA | GD | Pts | Qualification |
|---|---|---|---|---|---|---|---|---|---|---|
| 1 | United States | 3 | 3 | 0 | 0 | 32 | 0 | +32 | 9 | 2026 FIFA U-17 Women's World Cup |
| 2 | Puerto Rico | 3 | 2 | 0 | 1 | 12 | 5 | +7 | 6 | 2026 FIFA U-17 Women's World Cup |
| 3 | Haiti | 3 | 1 | 0 | 2 | 3 | 12 | −9 | 3 | |
| 4 | Bermuda | 3 | 0 | 0 | 3 | 0 | 30 | −30 | 0 | |

Source: CONCACAF
Rules for classification: Tiebreakers

| March 17 | United States | 19–0 | Bermuda | Alajuela, Costa Rica |
| 12:30 pm (14:30 UTC−6) | Stanislaus 3', 17', 53', 58'; Manning 5', 8'; Morrell 27', 39', 56'; Corona 47'; DiMaria 49', 52'; Paletta 59'; Whitham 69', 78', 86'; Aguilar 83'; Heathcock 84'; Hanf 87' | Report | | Stadium: Proyecto Goal FCRF Cancha 2 Referee: Minely Ureña (Dominican Republic) |

| March 19 | Haiti | 0–9 | United States | Alajuela, Costa Rica |
| 17:00 pm (15:00 UTC−6) | | Report | Mallebranche 5' (o.g.); Murray 8'; Aguilar 25', 45+1', 52'; Whitham 57'; Paletta 62'; Stanislaus 79', 81' | Stadium: Proyecto Goal FCRF Cancha 2 Attendance: 237; Referee: Marjorie Ponce (Nicaragua) |

| March 22 | United States | 4–0 | Puerto Rico | Alajuela, Costa Rica |
| 12:06 pm (10:06 UTC−6) | DiMaria 22' (pen.); Corona 36'; Whitham 50'; Morrell 55' | Report | | Stadium: Proyecto Goal FCRF Cancha 1 Attendance: 174; Referee: Marjorie Ponce (Nicaragua) |

===== FIFA U-17 Women's World Cup =====
====== Group E ======
| Pos | Team | Pld | W | D | L | GF | GA | GD | Pts | Qualification |
|---|---|---|---|---|---|---|---|---|---|---|
| 1 | China | 3 | 3 | 0 | 0 | 13 | 2 | +11 | 9 | Knockout stage |
| 2 | United States | 3 | 2 | 0 | 1 | 25 | 4 | +21 | 6 | Knockout stage |
| 3 | Kenya | 3 | 1 | 0 | 2 | 5 | 9 | −4 | 3 | Knockout stage |
| 4 | Samoa | 3 | 0 | 0 | 3 | 0 | 28 | −28 | 0 | |

Source: FIFA
Rules for classification: Group stage tiebreakers

| October 19 | United States | 17–0 | Samoa | Salé, Morocco |
| 14:00 ET | DiMaria 2', 18', 20', 30', 70', 73'; Corona 12'; Paletta 25', 37'; Murray 28'; Manning 45+4'; Stanislaus 57'; Reyna 64', 78'; Ortiz 75'; Brewer 87'; Hanf 90' | Report | | Stadium: Mohammed VI Football Academy (Pitch 3); Attendance: 682; Referee: Zoulaikha Harmasse (Morocco) |

| October 22 | United States | 6–1 | Kenya | Salé, Morocco |
| 14:00 ET | DiMaria 5', 22', 35' (pen.), 45+2' (pen.); Paletta 48'; Hanf 90+3' | Report | Atieno 90+5' | Stadium: Mohammed VI Football Academy (Pitch 3); Attendance: 249; Referee: Oh Hyeon-jeong (South Korea) |

| October 25 | China | 3–2 | United States | Salé, Morocco |
| 14:00 ET | Liu Yuxi 7', 81'; Zhao Jiayi 71' | Report | DiMaria 69'; Ortiz 90+7' | Stadium: Mohammed VI Football Academy (Pitch 3); Attendance: 658; Referee: Lara Lee (Australia) |

====== Knock-out stage ======
| October 29 R16 | Spain | 1–2 | United States | Salé, Morocco |
| | Molina 71' | Report | Stanislaus 43'; DiMaria 45+3' | Stadium: Mohammed VI Football Academy (Pitch 4); Attendance: 462; Referee: Dong Fangyu (China) |

| November 1 QF | North Korea | 3–0 | United States | Salé, Morocco |
| | Ri Ui-gyong 30', 56'; Ri Ye-rim 45+4' | Report | | Stadium: Mohammed VI Football Academy (Pitch 2); Attendance: 167; Referee: Lara Lee (Australia) |

== Club competitions ==
=== Men's ===
==== League competitions ====
===== Major League Soccer =====
====== Conference tables ======
Eastern Conference

MLS Eastern Conference table (2026)
| Pos | Team | Pld | W | L | T | GF | GA | GD | Pts | Qualification |
|---|---|---|---|---|---|---|---|---|---|---|
| 1 | Nashville SC | 34 | 23 | 3 | 8 | 71 | 25 | +46 | 77 | Qualification for round one and the CONCACAF Champions Cup round one |
| 2 | Inter Miami CF | 34 | 16 | 6 | 12 | 80 | 59 | +21 | 60 | Qualification for round one |
| 3 | New England Revolution | 34 | 18 | 12 | 4 | 55 | 47 | +8 | 58 | Qualification for round one |
| 4 | Chicago Fire FC | 34 | 16 | 11 | 7 | 64 | 54 | +10 | 55 | Qualification for round one |
| 5 | Charlotte FC | 34 | 15 | 10 | 9 | 66 | 51 | +15 | 54 | Qualification for round one |
| 6 | Philadelphia Union | 34 | 14 | 12 | 8 | 66 | 52 | +14 | 50 | Qualification for round one |
| 7 | Columbus Crew | 34 | 14 | 15 | 5 | 59 | 52 | +7 | 47 | Qualification for round one |
| 8 | Orlando City SC | 34 | 13 | 14 | 7 | 63 | 78 | −15 | 46 | Qualification for the wild card round |
| 9 | FC Cincinnati | 34 | 12 | 12 | 10 | 67 | 75 | −8 | 46 | Qualification for the wild card round |
| 10 | New York Red Bulls | 34 | 12 | 16 | 6 | 48 | 62 | −14 | 42 | |
| 11 | New York City FC | 34 | 10 | 12 | 12 | 49 | 45 | +4 | 42 | |
| 12 | Toronto FC | 34 | 9 | 13 | 12 | 52 | 67 | −15 | 39 | |
| 13 | Atlanta United FC | 34 | 9 | 19 | 6 | 43 | 60 | −17 | 33 | |
| 14 | D.C. United | 34 | 7 | 15 | 12 | 39 | 61 | −22 | 33 | |
| 15 | CF Montréal | 34 | 6 | 20 | 8 | 37 | 69 | −32 | 26 | |

Source: MLS
Rules for classification: 1) points; 2) total wins; 3) total goal differential; 4) total goals scored; 5) fewer disciplinary points; 6) away goal differential; 7) away goals scored; 8) home goals differential; 9) home goals scored; 10) coin toss (2 clubs tied) or drawing of lots (≥3 clubs tied)

Western Conference

MLS Western Conference table (2026)
| Pos | Team | Pld | W | L | T | GF | GA | GD | Pts | Qualification |
|---|---|---|---|---|---|---|---|---|---|---|
| 1 | Vancouver Whitecaps FC | 34 | 19 | 8 | 7 | 74 | 34 | +40 | 64 | Qualification for round one and the CONCACAF Champions Cup round one |
| 2 | FC Dallas | 34 | 16 | 8 | 10 | 62 | 51 | +11 | 58 | Qualification for round one |
| 3 | St. Louis City SC | 34 | 15 | 10 | 9 | 59 | 48 | +11 | 54 | Qualification for round one |
| 4 | San Jose Earthquakes | 34 | 14 | 10 | 10 | 57 | 51 | +6 | 52 | Qualification for round one |
| 5 | Houston Dynamo FC | 34 | 14 | 11 | 9 | 43 | 43 | 0 | 51 | Qualification for round one |
| 6 | Los Angeles FC | 34 | 12 | 11 | 11 | 52 | 40 | +12 | 47 | Qualification for round one |
| 7 | Portland Timbers | 34 | 13 | 14 | 7 | 62 | 61 | +1 | 46 | Qualification for round one |
| 8 | Seattle Sounders FC | 34 | 12 | 12 | 10 | 44 | 46 | −2 | 46 | Qualification for the wild card round |
| 9 | Real Salt Lake | 34 | 13 | 15 | 6 | 53 | 52 | +1 | 45 | Qualification for the wild card round |
| 10 | Minnesota United FC | 34 | 11 | 12 | 11 | 56 | 58 | −2 | 44 | |
| 11 | LA Galaxy | 34 | 11 | 12 | 11 | 50 | 57 | −7 | 44 | |
| 12 | Colorado Rapids | 34 | 12 | 15 | 7 | 47 | 50 | −3 | 43 | |
| 13 | San Diego FC | 34 | 9 | 14 | 11 | 57 | 63 | −6 | 38 | |
| 14 | Austin FC | 34 | 8 | 16 | 10 | 42 | 65 | −23 | 34 | |
| 15 | Sporting Kansas City | 34 | 7 | 22 | 5 | 40 | 81 | −41 | 26 | |

Source: MLS
Rules for classification: 1) points; 2) total wins; 3) total goal differential; 4) total goals scored; 5) fewer disciplinary points; 6) away goal differential; 7) away goals scored; 8) home goals differential; 9) home goals scored; 10) coin toss (2 clubs tied) or drawing of lots (≥3 clubs tied)

====== Overall 2026 table ======
Note: the table below has no impact on playoff qualification and is used solely for determining host of the MLS Cup, certain CCL spots, the Supporters' Shield trophy, seeding in the 2027 Canadian Championship, and 2027 MLS draft. The conference tables are the sole determinant for teams qualifying for the playoffs.

Overall MLS standings table
| Pos | Team | Pld | W | L | T | GF | GA | GD | Pts | Qualification |
|---|---|---|---|---|---|---|---|---|---|---|
| 1 | Nashville SC (S) | 34 | 23 | 3 | 8 | 71 | 25 | +46 | 77 | Qualification for the CONCACAF Champions Cup round one (Note: As 2026 MLS Supporters' Shield champions) |
| 2 | Vancouver Whitecaps FC | 34 | 19 | 8 | 7 | 74 | 34 | +40 | 64 | Qualification for the CONCACAF Champions Cup round one (Note: As Western Conference regular season winners) |
| 3 | Inter Miami CF | 34 | 16 | 6 | 12 | 80 | 59 | +21 | 60 | Qualification for the CONCACAF Champions Cup round one (Note: As one of the next two highest-ranked clubs in 2026 MLS Supporters' Shield not already qualified) |
| 4 | New England Revolution | 34 | 18 | 12 | 4 | 55 | 47 | +8 | 58 | Qualification for the CONCACAF Champions Cup round one |
| 5 | FC Dallas | 34 | 16 | 8 | 10 | 62 | 51 | +11 | 58 | |
| 6 | Chicago Fire FC | 34 | 16 | 11 | 7 | 64 | 54 | +10 | 55 | |
| 7 | Charlotte FC | 34 | 15 | 10 | 9 | 66 | 51 | +15 | 54 | |
| 8 | St. Louis City SC (U) | 34 | 15 | 10 | 9 | 59 | 48 | +11 | 54 | Qualification for the CONCACAF Champions Cup round one (Note: As winners of U.S. Open Cup) |
| 9 | San Jose Earthquakes | 34 | 14 | 10 | 10 | 57 | 51 | +6 | 52 | |
| 10 | Houston Dynamo FC | 34 | 14 | 11 | 9 | 43 | 43 | 0 | 51 | |
| 11 | Philadelphia Union | 34 | 14 | 12 | 8 | 66 | 52 | +14 | 50 | |
| 12 | Columbus Crew | 34 | 14 | 15 | 5 | 59 | 52 | +7 | 47 | |
| 13 | Los Angeles FC | 34 | 12 | 11 | 11 | 52 | 40 | +12 | 47 | |
| 14 | Portland Timbers | 34 | 13 | 14 | 7 | 62 | 61 | +1 | 46 | |
| 15 | Orlando City SC | 34 | 13 | 14 | 7 | 63 | 78 | −15 | 46 | |
| 16 | Seattle Sounders FC | 34 | 12 | 12 | 10 | 44 | 46 | −2 | 46 | |
| 17 | FC Cincinnati | 34 | 12 | 12 | 10 | 67 | 75 | −8 | 46 | |
| 18 | Real Salt Lake | 34 | 13 | 15 | 6 | 53 | 52 | +1 | 45 | |
| 19 | Minnesota United FC | 34 | 11 | 12 | 11 | 56 | 58 | −2 | 44 | |
| 20 | LA Galaxy | 34 | 11 | 12 | 11 | 50 | 57 | −7 | 44 | |
| 21 | Colorado Rapids | 34 | 12 | 15 | 7 | 47 | 50 | −3 | 43 | |
| 22 | New York Red Bulls | 34 | 12 | 16 | 6 | 48 | 62 | −14 | 42 | |
| 23 | New York City FC | 34 | 10 | 12 | 12 | 49 | 45 | +4 | 42 | |
| 24 | Toronto FC | 34 | 9 | 13 | 12 | 52 | 67 | −15 | 39 | |
| 25 | San Diego FC | 34 | 9 | 14 | 11 | 57 | 63 | −6 | 38 | |
| 26 | Austin FC | 34 | 8 | 16 | 10 | 42 | 65 | −23 | 34 | |
| 27 | Atlanta United FC | 34 | 9 | 19 | 6 | 43 | 60 | −17 | 33 | |
| 28 | D.C. United | 34 | 7 | 15 | 12 | 39 | 61 | −22 | 33 | |
| 29 | Sporting Kansas City | 34 | 7 | 22 | 5 | 40 | 81 | −41 | 26 | |
| 30 | CF Montréal | 34 | 6 | 20 | 8 | 37 | 69 | −32 | 26 | |

Source: MLS
Rules for classification: 1) points; 2) total wins; 3) total goal differential; 4) total goals scored; 5) fewer disciplinary points; 6) away goal differential; 7) away goals scored; 8) home goals differential; 9) home goals scored; 10) coin toss (2 clubs tied) or drawing of lots (≥3 clubs tied)
(S) Supporters' Shield winners; (U) U.S. Open Cup winners

====== MLS All-Star Game ======
2026 MLS All-Star Game
July 29, 2026
8:00 p.m. EDT

| MLS All-Stars (United States) (Canada) | 4–3 | (Mexico) Liga MX All-Stars |
|---|---|---|
| Son Heung-min 20', 23'; Zinckernagel 42'; Evander 58' | Report | Rey 9'; Rondón 55'; Paradela 90+1' |

Bank of America Stadium, Charlotte, North Carolina
Attendance: 35,197
Referee: Rubiel Vazquez (United States)

====== MLS Playoffs ======
Bracket

The higher seeded teams host single-elimination matches, with the MLS Cup host determined by overall points in the Supporters' Shield table. During the best-of-three round, the team with higher seed hosts the first match (and the third match, if required).

Wild card single match
E8 | Orlando City SC | 1
**E9** | **FC Cincinnati** | **3**
W8 | Seattle Sounders FC | 1 (2)
**W9** | **Real Salt Lake (p)** | **1 (4)**

Round one best-of-three series
E1 | Nashville SC
E9 | FC Cincinnati
E4 | Chicago Fire FC
E5 | Charlotte FC
E2 | Inter Miami CF | 0
**E7** | **Columbus Crew** | **3**
**E3** | **New England Revolution** | **2**
E6 | Philadelphia Union | 0
W1 | Vancouver Whitecaps FC
W9 | Real Salt Lake
W4 | San Jose Earthquakes
W5 | Houston Dynamo FC
**W2** | **FC Dallas** | **3**
W7 | Portland Timbers | 0
W3 | St. Louis City SC
W6 | Los Angeles FC

Conference semifinals single match
**Eastern Conference**
**Western Conference**

Conference finals single match

MLS Cup single match

===== USL Championship =====
====== Conference tables ======
Eastern Conference

| Pos | Team | Pld | W | L | T | GF | GA | GD | Pts | Qualification |
|---|---|---|---|---|---|---|---|---|---|---|
| 1 | Tampa Bay Rowdies (S) | 30 | 18 | 5 | 7 | 52 | 26 | +26 | 61 | Playoffs |
| 2 | Charleston Battery | 30 | 16 | 9 | 5 | 56 | 35 | +21 | 53 | Playoffs |
| 3 | Detroit City FC | 30 | 14 | 7 | 9 | 34 | 21 | +13 | 51 | Playoffs |
| 4 | Louisville City FC | 30 | 13 | 9 | 8 | 51 | 43 | +8 | 47 | Playoffs |
| 5 | Pittsburgh Riverhounds SC | 30 | 13 | 11 | 6 | 33 | 30 | +3 | 45 | Playoffs |
| 6 | Hartford Athletic | 30 | 10 | 7 | 13 | 35 | 33 | +2 | 43 | Playoffs |
| 7 | Rhode Island FC | 30 | 12 | 12 | 6 | 42 | 33 | +9 | 42 | Playoffs |
| 8 | Miami FC | 30 | 9 | 12 | 9 | 39 | 49 | −10 | 36 | Playoffs |
| 9 | Indy Eleven | 30 | 9 | 14 | 7 | 35 | 41 | −6 | 34 | |
| 10 | Birmingham Legion FC | 30 | 6 | 12 | 12 | 40 | 46 | −6 | 30 | |
| 11 | Loudoun United FC | 30 | 6 | 11 | 13 | 40 | 46 | −6 | 31 | |
| 12 | Brooklyn FC | 30 | 5 | 19 | 6 | 34 | 63 | −29 | 21 | |
| 13 | Sporting Club Jacksonville | 30 | 3 | 22 | 5 | 32 | 78 | −46 | 14 | |

Updated to match(es) played on October 24, 2026. Source: USL Championship Standings
Rules for classification: 1) total wins against conference opponents; 2) goal differential against conference opponents; 3) goals scored against conference opponents; 4) head-to-head points against conference opponents; 5) points per game against conference opponents; 6) points per game against non-conference opponents; 7) fewest disciplinary points; 8) coin toss or drawing of lots
(S) Players' Shield winner

Western Conference

| Pos | Team | Pld | W | L | T | GF | GA | GD | Pts | Qualification |
|---|---|---|---|---|---|---|---|---|---|---|
| 1 | New Mexico United | 30 | 15 | 8 | 7 | 45 | 34 | +11 | 52 | Playoffs |
| 2 | Sacramento Republic FC (C) | 30 | 13 | 5 | 12 | 42 | 28 | +14 | 51 | Playoffs |
| 3 | El Paso Locomotive FC | 30 | 15 | 10 | 5 | 48 | 38 | +10 | 50 | Playoffs |
| 4 | Lexington SC | 30 | 14 | 10 | 6 | 57 | 39 | +18 | 48 | Playoffs |
| 5 | Colorado Springs Switchbacks FC | 30 | 13 | 9 | 8 | 44 | 38 | +6 | 47 | Playoffs |
| 6 | San Antonio FC | 30 | 11 | 7 | 12 | 32 | 30 | +2 | 45 | Playoffs |
| 7 | FC Tulsa | 30 | 11 | 9 | 10 | 34 | 31 | +3 | 43 | Playoffs |
| 8 | Phoenix Rising FC | 30 | 11 | 10 | 9 | 45 | 46 | −1 | 42 | Playoffs |
| 9 | Orange County SC | 30 | 10 | 11 | 9 | 39 | 49 | −10 | 39 | |
| 10 | Oakland Roots SC | 30 | 9 | 10 | 11 | 39 | 40 | −1 | 38 | |
| 11 | Las Vegas Lights FC | 30 | 10 | 14 | 6 | 41 | 48 | −7 | 36 | |
| 12 | Monterey Bay FC | 30 | 6 | 18 | 6 | 32 | 52 | −20 | 24 | |

Updated to match(es) played on October 24, 2026. Source: USL Championship Standings
Rules for classification: 1) total wins against conference opponents; 2) goal differential against conference opponents; 3) goals scored against conference opponents; 4) head-to-head points against conference opponents; 5) points per game against conference opponents; 6) points per game against non-conference opponents; 7) fewest disciplinary points; 8) coin toss or drawing of lots
(C) Champions

====== USL Championship Playoffs ======
Bracket

Conference Quarterfinals; October 30-November 1 | Conference Semifinals; November 7
E1 | Tampa Bay Rowdies | 1 (4)
E8 | **Miami FC (p)** | **1 (5)**
E4 | **Louisville City FC** | **3**
E8 | Miami FC | 2
E4 | **Louisville City FC (a.e.t.)** | 1
E5 | Pittsburgh Riverhounds SC | 0
**Eastern Conference**
E3 | Detroit City FC | 1
E6 | **Hartford Athletic** | **2**
E2 | **Charleston Battery (p)** | **3 (5)**
E6 | Hartford Athletic | 3 (4)
E2 | **Charleston Battery (p)** | **1 (5)**
E7 | Rhode Island FC | 1 (4)
W1 | **New Mexico United** | 2
W8 | Phoenix Rising FC | 0
W1 | **New Mexico United** | **4**
W5 | Colorado Springs Switchbacks FC | 0
W4 | Lexington SC | 1 (4)
W5 | **Colorado Springs Switchbacks FC (p)** | **1 (5)**
**Western Conference**
W3 | **El Paso Locomotive FC** | **2**
W6 | San Antonio FC | 1
W2 | **Sacramento Republic FC** | **2**
W3 | El Paso Locomotive FC | 1
W2 | **Sacramento Republic FC** | 1
W7 | FC Tulsa | 0

Conference Finals; November 14–15
E2 | Charleston Battery | 0
E4 | **Louisville City FC** | **2**
W1 | New Mexico United | 1
W2 | **Sacramento Republic FC (a.e.t.)** | **2**

USL Championship Final; November 21
W2 | **Sacramento Republic FC (p)** | **1 (4)**
E4 | Louisville City FC | 1 (3)

Final

November 21
9:00 AM PST
Final

| Sacramento Republic FC | 1–1 (a.e.t.) | Louisville City FC |
|---|---|---|
| Jennings 14'; M. Rodriguez (yellow card) 98' | Report | Serrano 31'; Babacar Niang (yellow card) 33' |
Penalties
| M. Rodriguez (penalty scored); Desmond (penalty missed); Kaye (penalty scored); K. Edwards (penalty scored); Spaulding (penalty scored) | 4–3 | (penalty scored) Totsch; (penalty missed) E. Davila; (penalty scored) Serrano; (penalty missed) Showunmi; (penalty scored) Duncan |

Heart Health Park, Sacramento, California
Attendance: 11,569
Referee: Abdou Ndiaye

===== USL League One =====
====== League table ======
| Pos | Team | Pld | W | L | T | GF | GA | GD | Pts | Qualification |
|---|---|---|---|---|---|---|---|---|---|---|
| 1 | Charlotte Independence (S, C) | 32 | 20 | 6 | 6 | 74 | 46 | +28 | 66 | Playoffs |
| 2 | Union Omaha | 32 | 19 | 8 | 5 | 54 | 34 | +20 | 62 | Playoffs |
| 3 | AC Boise | 32 | 17 | 8 | 7 | 51 | 41 | +10 | 58 | Playoffs |
| 4 | Forward Madison FC | 32 | 16 | 8 | 8 | 54 | 30 | +24 | 56 | Playoffs |
| 5 | Spokane Velocity FC | 32 | 16 | 10 | 6 | 50 | 44 | +6 | 54 | Playoffs |
| 6 | One Knoxville SC | 32 | 15 | 8 | 9 | 52 | 36 | +16 | 54 | Playoffs |
| 7 | Chattanooga Red Wolves SC | 32 | 14 | 13 | 5 | 51 | 45 | +6 | 47 | Playoffs |
| 8 | FC Naples | 32 | 14 | 14 | 4 | 39 | 46 | −7 | 46 | Playoffs |
| 9 | Fort Wayne FC | 32 | 12 | 11 | 9 | 47 | 42 | +5 | 45 | |
| 10 | Westchester SC | 32 | 11 | 14 | 7 | 55 | 51 | +4 | 40 | |
| 11 | Sarasota Paradise | 32 | 11 | 14 | 7 | 49 | 51 | −2 | 40 | |
| 12 | Corpus Christi FC | 32 | 9 | 13 | 10 | 36 | 51 | −15 | 37 | |
| 13 | AV Alta FC | 32 | 8 | 14 | 10 | 40 | 48 | −8 | 34 | |
| 14 | Portland Hearts of Pine | 32 | 8 | 14 | 10 | 48 | 58 | −10 | 34 | |
| 15 | Greenville Triumph SC | 32 | 8 | 18 | 6 | 37 | 60 | −23 | 30 | |
| 16 | New York Cosmos | 32 | 7 | 19 | 6 | 40 | 66 | −26 | 27 | |
| 17 | Richmond Kickers | 32 | 7 | 20 | 5 | 37 | 65 | −28 | 26 | |

Source: USL League One
Rules for classification: 1) points; 2) total wins; 3) total goal differential; 4) total goals scored; 5) points earned against top four finishers; 6) disciplinary points; 7) drawing of lots.
(C) Champions; (S) Players' Shield winner

Bracket

**Quarterfinals**; October 30—November 1
1 | **Charlotte Independence** | **5**
8 | FC Naples | 1
4 | **Forward Madison FC** | **2**
5 | Spokane Velocity FC | 1
2 | Union Omaha | 1 (4)
7 | **Chattanooga Red Wolves SC** | **1 (5)**
3 | **Athletic Club Boise** | **2**
6 | One Knoxville SC | 0

**Semifinals**; November 7—8
1 | **Charlotte Independence** | 2
4 | Forward Madison FC | 1
7 | Chattanooga Red Wolves SC | 0
3 | **Athletic Club Boise** | **1**

**Final**; November 14
1 | **Charlotte Independence** | **4**
3 | Athletic Club Boise | 2

====== USL League One Final ======
November 14, 2026
7:30 PM EST

| Charlotte Independence | 4–2 | Athletic Club Boise |
|---|---|---|
| Skinner (yellow card) 42' (goal) 84'; Marou 58', 87', 90+2' (yellow card) 70'; Romero (yellow card) 90+10' | Report | Moshobane 33'; Mayaka (yellow card) 41'; Dengler (yellow card) 63'; Manin 76' (o.g.); Amang (yellow card) 90+6' |

Sportsplex at Matthews, Matthews, North Carolina
Attendance: 3,326
Referee: Matthew Thompson

Championship Game MVP: (Cameroon) Souaibou Marou (CLT)

===== MLS Next Pro =====
====== Eastern Conference ======
| Pos | Div | Team | Pld | W | SOW | SOL | L | GF | GA | GD | Pts | Qualification |
|---|---|---|---|---|---|---|---|---|---|---|---|---|
| 1 | SE | Crown Legacy FC | 28 | 15 | 5 | 3 | 5 | 67 | 39 | +28 | 58 | Round one |
| 2 | SE | Chattanooga FC (C) | 28 | 15 | 4 | 3 | 6 | 56 | 39 | +17 | 56 | Round one |
| 3 | SE | Atlanta United 2 | 28 | 14 | 1 | 4 | 9 | 62 | 46 | +16 | 48 | Round one |
| 4 | NE | Columbus Crew 2 | 28 | 12 | 5 | 2 | 9 | 49 | 43 | +6 | 48 | Round one |
| 5 | NE | New England Revolution II | 28 | 12 | 4 | 4 | 8 | 47 | 42 | +5 | 48 | Round one |
| 6 | NE | New York City FC II | 28 | 13 | 3 | 2 | 10 | 50 | 44 | +6 | 47 | Round one |
| 7 | NE | CT United FC | 28 | 14 | 2 | 0 | 12 | 59 | 52 | +7 | 46 | Round one |
| 8 | NE | New York Red Bulls II | 28 | 13 | 2 | 3 | 10 | 58 | 48 | +10 | 46 | Wild card round |
| 9 | SE | Huntsville City FC | 28 | 12 | 2 | 4 | 10 | 49 | 47 | +2 | 44 | Wild card round |
| 10 | SE | Orlando City B | 28 | 11 | 4 | 3 | 10 | 55 | 56 | −1 | 44 | |
| 11 | NE | Philadelphia Union II | 28 | 12 | 2 | 3 | 11 | 37 | 40 | −3 | 43 | |
| 12 | NE | Toronto FC II | 28 | 11 | 2 | 2 | 13 | 48 | 56 | −8 | 39 | |
| 13 | SE | Chicago Fire FC II | 28 | 10 | 3 | 3 | 12 | 50 | 48 | +2 | 39 | |
| 14 | SE | Carolina Core FC | 28 | 5 | 5 | 6 | 12 | 40 | 53 | −13 | 31 | |
| 15 | NE | FC Cincinnati 2 | 28 | 5 | 2 | 1 | 20 | 32 | 62 | −30 | 20 | |
| 16 | SE | Inter Miami CF II | 28 | 3 | 1 | 4 | 20 | 30 | 74 | −44 | 15 | |

Source: MLSNP
Rules for classification: 1) Points; 2) Total regulation wins; 3) Total goal differential; 4) Total goals scored; 5) Total shootout wins; 6) Away goal differential; 7) Away goals scored; 8) Home goals differential; 9) Home goals scored; 10) Fewer disciplinary points; 11) Drawing of lots.
(C) Champion

====== Western Conference ======
| Pos | Div | Team | Pld | W | SOW | SOL | L | GF | GA | GD | Pts | Qualification |
|---|---|---|---|---|---|---|---|---|---|---|---|---|
| 1 | FR | Austin FC II | 28 | 19 | 2 | 4 | 3 | 54 | 21 | +33 | 65 | Round one |
| 2 | PC | Portland Timbers 2 | 28 | 14 | 5 | 5 | 4 | 37 | 29 | +8 | 57 | Round one |
| 3 | PC | Ventura County FC | 28 | 14 | 4 | 3 | 7 | 58 | 36 | +22 | 53 | Round one |
| 4 | FR | Houston Dynamo 2 | 28 | 14 | 4 | 2 | 8 | 52 | 32 | +20 | 52 | Round one |
| 5 | FR | Minnesota United FC 2 | 28 | 12 | 3 | 3 | 10 | 43 | 39 | +4 | 45 | Round one |
| 6 | PC | Los Angeles FC 2 | 28 | 11 | 3 | 6 | 8 | 50 | 48 | +2 | 45 | Round one |
| 7 | FR | St. Louis City 2 | 28 | 10 | 4 | 6 | 8 | 42 | 40 | +2 | 44 | Round one |
| 8 | PC | San Jose Earthquakes II | 28 | 11 | 3 | 3 | 11 | 51 | 36 | +15 | 42 | Wild card round |
| 9 | PC | Tacoma Defiance | 28 | 11 | 3 | 2 | 12 | 40 | 44 | −4 | 41 | Wild card round |
| 10 | FR | North Texas SC | 28 | 8 | 6 | 4 | 10 | 41 | 41 | 0 | 40 | |
| 11 | PC | Real Monarchs | 28 | 8 | 4 | 1 | 15 | 38 | 55 | −17 | 33 | |
| 12 | PC | Whitecaps FC 2 | 28 | 6 | 4 | 1 | 17 | 39 | 62 | −23 | 27 | |
| 13 | FR | Sporting Kansas City II | 28 | 6 | 1 | 3 | 18 | 36 | 75 | −39 | 23 | |
| 14 | FR | Colorado Rapids 2 | 28 | 4 | 2 | 5 | 17 | 28 | 51 | −23 | 21 | |

Source: MLSNP
Rules for classification: 1) Points; 2) Total regulation wins; 3) Total goal differential; 4) Total goals scored; 5) Total shootout wins; 6) Away goal differential; 7) Away goals scored; 8) Home goals differential; 9) Home goals scored; 10) Fewer disciplinary points; 11) Drawing of lots.

====== Overall table ======
| Pos | Div | Team | Pld | W | SOW | SOL | L | GF | GA | GD | Pts | Awards |
|---|---|---|---|---|---|---|---|---|---|---|---|---|
| 1 | FR | Austin FC II (S) | 28 | 19 | 2 | 4 | 3 | 54 | 21 | +33 | 65 | Regular season champion |
| 2 | SE | Crown Legacy FC | 28 | 15 | 5 | 3 | 5 | 67 | 39 | +28 | 58 | |
| 3 | PC | Portland Timbers 2 | 28 | 14 | 5 | 5 | 4 | 37 | 29 | +8 | 57 | |
| 4 | SE | Chattanooga FC (C) | 28 | 15 | 4 | 3 | 6 | 56 | 39 | +17 | 56 | |
| 5 | PC | Ventura County FC | 28 | 14 | 4 | 3 | 7 | 58 | 36 | +22 | 53 | |
| 6 | FR | Houston Dynamo 2 | 28 | 14 | 4 | 2 | 8 | 53 | 33 | +20 | 52 | |
| 7 | SE | Atlanta United 2 | 28 | 14 | 1 | 4 | 9 | 62 | 46 | +16 | 48 | |
| 8 | NE | Columbus Crew 2 | 28 | 12 | 5 | 2 | 9 | 49 | 43 | +6 | 48 | |
| 9 | NE | New England Revolution II | 28 | 12 | 4 | 4 | 8 | 47 | 42 | +5 | 48 | |
| 10 | NE | New York City FC II | 28 | 13 | 3 | 2 | 10 | 50 | 44 | +6 | 47 | |
| 11 | NE | CT United FC | 28 | 14 | 2 | 0 | 12 | 59 | 52 | +7 | 46 | |
| 12 | NE | New York Red Bulls II | 28 | 13 | 2 | 3 | 10 | 58 | 48 | +10 | 46 | |
| 13 | FR | Minnesota United FC 2 | 28 | 12 | 3 | 3 | 10 | 43 | 39 | +4 | 45 | |
| 14 | PC | Los Angeles FC 2 | 28 | 11 | 3 | 6 | 8 | 50 | 48 | +2 | 45 | |
| 15 | SE | Huntsville City FC | 28 | 12 | 2 | 4 | 10 | 49 | 47 | +2 | 44 | |
| 16 | SE | Orlando City B | 28 | 11 | 4 | 3 | 10 | 55 | 56 | −1 | 44 | |
| 17 | FR | St. Louis City 2 | 28 | 10 | 4 | 6 | 8 | 42 | 40 | +2 | 44 | |
| 18 | NE | Philadelphia Union II | 28 | 12 | 2 | 3 | 11 | 37 | 40 | −3 | 43 | |
| 19 | PC | San Jose Earthquakes II | 28 | 11 | 3 | 3 | 11 | 51 | 36 | +15 | 42 | |
| 20 | PC | Tacoma Defiance | 28 | 11 | 3 | 2 | 12 | 40 | 44 | −4 | 41 | |
| 21 | FR | North Texas SC | 28 | 8 | 6 | 4 | 10 | 42 | 41 | +1 | 40 | |
| 22 | NE | Toronto FC II | 28 | 11 | 2 | 2 | 13 | 48 | 56 | −8 | 39 | |
| 23 | SE | Chicago Fire FC II | 28 | 10 | 3 | 3 | 12 | 50 | 48 | +2 | 39 | |
| 24 | PC | Real Monarchs | 28 | 8 | 4 | 1 | 15 | 38 | 55 | −17 | 33 | |
| 25 | SE | Carolina Core FC | 28 | 5 | 5 | 6 | 12 | 40 | 53 | −13 | 31 | |
| 26 | PC | Whitecaps FC 2 | 28 | 6 | 4 | 1 | 17 | 39 | 62 | −23 | 27 | |
| 27 | FR | Sporting Kansas City II | 28 | 6 | 1 | 3 | 18 | 36 | 75 | −39 | 23 | |
| 28 | FR | Colorado Rapids 2 | 28 | 4 | 2 | 5 | 17 | 28 | 52 | −24 | 21 | |
| 29 | NE | FC Cincinnati 2 | 28 | 5 | 2 | 1 | 20 | 32 | 62 | −30 | 20 | |
| 30 | SE | Inter Miami CF II | 28 | 3 | 1 | 4 | 20 | 30 | 74 | −44 | 15 | |

Source: MLSNP
Rules for classification: 1) Points; 2) Total regulation wins; 3) Total goal differential; 4) Total goals scored; 5) Total shootout wins; 6) Away goal differential; 7) Away goals scored; 8) Home goals differential; 9) Home goals scored; 10) Fewer disciplinary points; 11) Drawing of lots.
(C) Champion; (S) ?

====== MLS Next Pro Playoffs ======
Bracket

| Eastern Play-in Round (October 11) |
| **E8** | **New York Red Bulls II** | **3** |
| E9 | Huntsville City FC | 1 |

| Western Play-in Round (October 11) |
| **W8** | **San Jose Earthquakes II** | **4 (3)** |
| W9 | Tacoma Defiance | 4 (1) |

Conference Quarterfinals (October 16–18) | Conference Semifinals (October 25)
**E1** | **Crown Legacy FC** | **2**
E8 | New York Red Bulls II | 1
E1 | Crown Legacy FC | 1
**E4** | **Columbus Crew 2** | **2**
**E4** | **Columbus Crew 2** | **2**
E5 | New England Revolution II | 1
**Eastern Conference**
**E2** | **Chattanooga FC** | **3**
E6 | New York City FC II | 1
**E2** | **Chattanooga FC** | **3**
E7 | CT United FC | 1
E3 | Atlanta United 2 | 0
**E7** | **CT United FC** | **1**
**W1** | **Austin FC II** | **2**
W8 | San Jose Earthquakes II | 1
W1 | Austin FC II | 0
**W6** | **Los Angeles FC 2** | **1**
W4 | Houston Dynamo 2 | 2 (3)
**W6** | **Los Angeles FC 2** | **2 (4)**
**Western Conference**
**W2** | **Portland Timbers 2** | **2**
W7 | St. Louis City SC 2 | 0
W2 | Portland Timbers 2 | 0
**W3** | **Ventura County FC** | **1**
**W3** | **Ventura County FC (a.e.t.)** | **3**
W5 | Minnesota United FC 2 | 2

Conference Finals (October 30 – November 1)
E4 | Columbus Crew 2 | 2
**E2** | **Chattanooga FC** | **3**
**W6** | **Los Angeles FC 2** | **1**
W3 | Ventura County FC | 0

MLS Next Pro Final (November 8)
**E2** | **Chattanooga FC** | **1**
W6 | Los Angeles FC 2 | 0

=== 2026 MLS Next Pro Cup Final ===
November 8
6:00 PM EST

| Chattanooga FC | 1–0 | Los Angeles FC 2 |
|---|---|---|
| Barker John 31' | Report | Guerra (yellow card) 76' |

Finley Stadium, Chattanooga, Tennessee
Attendance: 10,228
Referee: Rodrigo Albuquerque

==== Cup competitions ====
===== US Open Cup =====
Quarterfinals; May 19–20
**MLS** | **(Missouri) St. Louis City SC (p)** | **2 (4)**
MLS | (Texas) Houston Dynamo FC | 2 (2)
West
**MLS** | **Colorado Rapids** | **2**
MLS | (California) San Jose Earthquakes | 0
**MLS** | **(Florida) Orlando City SC** | **4**
MLS | (Georgia (U.S. state)) Atlanta United FC | 1
East
**MLS** | **(Ohio) Columbus Crew** | **1**
MLS | (New York (state)) New York City FC | 0

Semifinals; September 16
**MLS** | **(Missouri) St. Louis City SC** | **3**
MLS | Colorado Rapids | 0
MLS | (Florida) Orlando City SC | 1
**MLS** | **(Ohio) Columbus Crew** | **2**

Final; October 21
**MLS** | **(Missouri) St. Louis City SC (p)** | **0 (5)**
MLS | (Ohio) Columbus Crew | 0 (3)

====== Final ======
October 21, 2026
20:00 EDT

| Columbus Crew (Ohio) | 0–0 (a.e.t.) | (Missouri) St. Louis City SC |
|---|---|---|
| | Report |
Penalties
| Rodríguez (penalty missed); Amundsen (penalty scored); Tapia (penalty scored); Herrera (penalty scored) | 3–5 | (penalty scored) Baumgartl; (penalty scored) MacNaughton; (penalty scored) Durkin; (penalty scored) Downs; (penalty scored) Edelman |

ScottsMiracle-Gro Field, Columbus, Ohio
Attendance: 20,250
Referee: Guido Gonzales Jr.

=== Final ===
October 4
3:00 PM EDT

| Hartford Athletic | 0–1 | Louisville City FC |
|---|---|---|
| | Report | McFadden 12' |

Trinity Health Stadium, Hartford, Connecticut
Attendance: 6,179
Referee: Elton García

==== CONCACAF competitions ====
===== CONCACAF Champions Cup =====
| Club | Competition | Final round |
|---|---|---|
| Seattle Sounders FC | 2026 CONCACAF Champions Cup | Quarter-finals |
| Inter Miami CF | 2026 CONCACAF Champions Cup | Round of 16 |
| LA Galaxy | 2026 CONCACAF Champions Cup | Quarter-finals |
| Philadelphia Union | 2026 CONCACAF Champions Cup | Round of 16 |
| San Diego FC | 2026 CONCACAF Champions Cup | Round of 16 |
| FC Cincinnati | 2026 CONCACAF Champions Cup | Round of 16 |
| Los Angeles FC | 2026 CONCACAF Champions Cup | Semi-finals |
| Nashville SC | 2026 CONCACAF Champions Cup | Semi-finals |

teams in bold are still active in the competition

====== First round ======
| Team 1 | Agg. | Team 2 | 1st leg | 2nd leg |
|---|---|---|---|---|
| San Diego FC (United States) | 4–2 | (Mexico) UNAM | 4–1 | 0–1 |
| Sporting San Miguelito (Panama) | 1–1 (a) | (United States) LA Galaxy | 1–1 | 0–0 |
| Real España (Honduras) | 1–7 | (United States) Los Angeles FC | 1–6 | 0–1 |
| Atlético Ottawa (Canada) | 0–7 | (United States) Nashville SC | 0–2 | 0–5 |
| Defence Force (Trinidad and Tobago) | 0–12 | (United States) Philadelphia Union | 0–5 | 0–7 |
| O&M (Dominican Republic) | 0–13 | (United States) FC Cincinnati | 0–4 | 0–9 |

====== Round of 16 ======
| Team 1 | Agg. | Team 2 | 1st leg | 2nd leg |
|---|---|---|---|---|
| San Diego FC (United States) | 3–6 | (Mexico) Toluca | 3–2 | 0–4 |
| LA Galaxy (United States) | 6–0 | (Jamaica) Mount Pleasant | 3–0 | 3–0 |
| Los Angeles FC (United States) | 3–2 | (Costa Rica) Alajuelense | 1–1 | 2–1 |
| Nashville SC (United States) | 1–1 (a) | (United States) Inter Miami CF | 0–0 | 1–1 |
| Philadelphia Union (United States) | 1–2 | (Mexico) América | 0–1 | 1–1 |
| FC Cincinnati (United States) | 4–5 | (Mexico) UANL | 3–0 | 1–5 |
| Vancouver Whitecaps FC (Canada) | 1–5 | (United States) Seattle Sounders FC | 0–3 | 1–2 |

====== Quarter-finals ======
| Team 1 | Agg. | Team 2 | 1st leg | 2nd leg |
|---|---|---|---|---|
| Toluca (Mexico) | 7–2 | (United States) LA Galaxy | 4–2 | 3–0 |
| Los Angeles FC (United States) | 4–1 | (Mexico) Cruz Azul | 3–0 | 1–1 |
| Nashville SC (United States) | 1–0 | (Mexico) América | 0–0 | 1–0 |
| UANL (Mexico) | 3–3 (a) | (United States) Seattle Sounders FC | 2–0 | 1–3 |

====== Semi-finals ======
| Team 1 | Agg. | Team 2 | 1st leg | 2nd leg |
|---|---|---|---|---|
| Los Angeles FC (United States) | 2–5 | (Mexico) Toluca | 2–1 | 0–4 |
| Nashville SC (United States) | 0–2 | (Mexico) UANL | 0–1 | 0–1 |

===== Leagues Cup =====
====== League stage ======
| Pos | Team | Pld | W | PW | PL | L | GF | GA | GD | Pts | Qualification |
|---|---|---|---|---|---|---|---|---|---|---|---|
| 1 | Chicago Fire FC | 3 | 3 | 0 | 0 | 0 | 7 | 2 | +5 | 9 | Advance to knockout stage |
| 2 | Austin FC | 3 | 2 | 1 | 0 | 0 | 6 | 1 | +5 | 8 | Advance to knockout stage |
| 3 | Columbus Crew | 3 | 2 | 1 | 0 | 0 | 6 | 3 | +3 | 8 | Advance to knockout stage |
| 4 | Real Salt Lake | 3 | 2 | 0 | 1 | 0 | 8 | 1 | +7 | 7 | Advance to knockout stage |
| 5 | Los Angeles FC | 3 | 1 | 2 | 0 | 0 | 3 | 2 | +1 | 7 | |
| 6 | Charlotte FC | 3 | 2 | 0 | 0 | 1 | 5 | 1 | +4 | 6 | |
| 7 | Portland Timbers | 3 | 2 | 0 | 0 | 1 | 9 | 6 | +3 | 6 | |
| 8 | FC Cincinnati | 3 | 2 | 0 | 0 | 1 | 6 | 3 | +3 | 6 | |
| 9 | FC Dallas | 3 | 2 | 0 | 0 | 1 | 4 | 3 | +1 | 6 | |
| 10 | San Diego FC | 3 | 2 | 0 | 0 | 1 | 5 | 5 | 0 | 6 | |
| 11 | Orlando City SC | 3 | 1 | 1 | 0 | 1 | 5 | 5 | 0 | 5 | |
| 12 | Minnesota United FC | 3 | 1 | 0 | 1 | 1 | 4 | 3 | +1 | 4 | |
| 13 | Nashville SC | 3 | 1 | 0 | 0 | 2 | 5 | 4 | +1 | 3 | |
| 14 | Inter Miami CF | 3 | 1 | 0 | 0 | 2 | 7 | 7 | 0 | 3 | |
| 15 | New York City FC | 3 | 1 | 0 | 0 | 2 | 4 | 4 | 0 | 3 | |
| 16 | Seattle Sounders FC | 3 | 1 | 0 | 0 | 2 | 4 | 5 | −1 | 3 | |
| 17 | Philadelphia Union | 3 | 1 | 0 | 0 | 2 | 3 | 4 | −1 | 3 | |
| 18 | Vancouver Whitecaps FC | 3 | 0 | 0 | 1 | 2 | 2 | 5 | −3 | 1 | |

Source: Leagues Cup

====== Knockout stage ======
Quarterfinals

Quarterfinals
| Team 1 | Score | Team 2 |
|---|---|---|
| Monterrey (Mexico) | 2–1 | (United States) Chicago Fire FC |
| León (Mexico) | 3–0 | (United States) Real Salt Lake |
| Toluca (Mexico) | 2–0 | (United States) Austin FC |
| América (Mexico) | 2–0 | (United States) Columbus Crew |

===== Campeones Cup =====
September 16, 2026
8:00 p.m. EDT (UTC−4)

| Inter Miami CF (United States Soccer Federation) | 2–0 | (Mexican Football Federation) Cruz Azul |
|---|---|---|
| Messi 24'; Casemiro 81' | Report |

Nu Stadium, Miami, Florida
Attendance: 26,495
Referee: Keylor Herrera (Costa Rica)

=== Women's ===
==== League competitions ====
===== National Women's Soccer League =====
====== Regular season ======
| Pos | Team | Pld | W | D | L | GF | GA | GD | Pts | Qualification |
|---|---|---|---|---|---|---|---|---|---|---|
| 1 | Gotham FC (S) | 30 | 18 | 7 | 5 | 39 | 23 | +16 | 61 | Playoffs and CONCACAF W Champions Cup |
| 2 | San Diego Wave FC | 30 | 18 | 4 | 8 | 45 | 31 | +14 | 58 | Playoffs and CONCACAF W Champions Cup |
| 3 | Washington Spirit | 30 | 17 | 4 | 9 | 43 | 28 | +15 | 55 | Playoffs |
| 4 | Kansas City Current (C) | 30 | 16 | 5 | 9 | 54 | 39 | +15 | 53 | Playoffs |
| 5 | Angel City FC | 30 | 15 | 7 | 8 | 54 | 32 | +22 | 52 | Playoffs |
| 6 | Portland Thorns FC | 30 | 14 | 8 | 8 | 50 | 41 | +9 | 50 | Playoffs |
| 7 | Utah Royals | 30 | 14 | 5 | 11 | 44 | 39 | +5 | 47 | Playoffs |
| 8 | Seattle Reign FC | 30 | 14 | 5 | 11 | 37 | 33 | +4 | 47 | Playoffs |
| 9 | North Carolina Courage | 30 | 14 | 3 | 13 | 52 | 42 | +10 | 45 | |
| 10 | Denver Summit FC | 30 | 11 | 8 | 11 | 53 | 42 | +11 | 41 | |
| 11 | Orlando Pride | 30 | 11 | 3 | 16 | 39 | 47 | −8 | 36 | |
| 12 | Houston Dash | 30 | 9 | 6 | 15 | 38 | 44 | −6 | 33 | |
| 13 | Boston Legacy FC | 30 | 9 | 6 | 15 | 41 | 53 | −12 | 33 | |
| 14 | Bay FC | 30 | 7 | 6 | 17 | 30 | 47 | −17 | 27 | |
| 15 | Racing Louisville FC | 30 | 7 | 3 | 20 | 38 | 62 | −24 | 24 | |
| 16 | Chicago Stars FC | 30 | 5 | 2 | 23 | 17 | 71 | −54 | 17 | |

Source: NWSL
Rules for classification: 1) points; 2) total goal difference; 3) total wins; 4) total goals scored; 5) head-to-head points; 6) head-to-head goal goals scored; 7) fewest disciplinary points; 8) coin toss (if 2 clubs tied) or drawing of lots (if ≥3 clubs tied).
(C) Champions; (S) NWSL Shield

====== Playoffs ======
Bracket

**Quarterfinals**
**1** | **Gotham FC** | **1**
8 | Seattle Reign FC | 0
**4** | **Kansas City Current** | **1 (a.e.t.)**
5 | Angel City FC | 0
**3** | **Washington Spirit** | **4**
6 | Portland Thorns FC | 1
2 | San Diego Wave FC | 0
**7** | **Utah Royals** | **1**

**Semifinals**
1 | Gotham FC | 1
**4** | **Kansas City Current** | **2**
**3** | **Washington Spirit** | **2**
7 | Utah Royals | 1

**Championship**
3 | Washington Spirit | 1
**4** | **Kansas City Current** | **2**

Championship

November 21, 2026
8:00 p.m. EST

| Washington Spirit | 1–2 | Kansas City Current |
|---|---|---|
| | Report |

Audi Field, Washington, D.C.
Referee: Joshua Encarnacion

===== USL Super League =====
====== 2025–26 ======
Regular season

| Pos | Team | Pld | W | L | T | GF | GA | GD | Pts | Qualification |
|---|---|---|---|---|---|---|---|---|---|---|
| 1 | Lexington (C, S) | 28 | 14 | 3 | 11 | 50 | 24 | +26 | 53 | Playoffs |
| 2 | Sporting JAX | 28 | 16 | 7 | 5 | 54 | 32 | +22 | 53 | Playoffs |
| 3 | Carolina Ascent | 28 | 15 | 7 | 6 | 39 | 27 | +12 | 51 | Playoffs |
| 4 | Dallas Trinity | 28 | 11 | 10 | 7 | 36 | 40 | −4 | 40 | Playoffs |
| 5 | Spokane Zephyr | 28 | 10 | 9 | 9 | 34 | 28 | +6 | 39 | |
| 6 | DC Power | 28 | 8 | 11 | 9 | 34 | 32 | +2 | 33 | |
| 7 | Brooklyn | 28 | 6 | 14 | 8 | 31 | 44 | −13 | 26 | |
| 8 | Tampa Bay Sun | 28 | 5 | 14 | 9 | 27 | 46 | −19 | 24 | |
| 9 | Fort Lauderdale United | 28 | 5 | 15 | 8 | 30 | 62 | −32 | 23 | |

Updated to match(es) played on May 16, 2026. Source: Gainbridge Super League
Rules for classification: 1) head-to-head points; 2) total goal differential; 3) total goals scored; 4) disciplinary points; 5) drawing of lots.
(C) Champions; (S) Players' Shield winner

Championship

May 30, 2026
7:00 PM EDT

| Lexington SC | 3–1 (a.e.t.) | Carolina Ascent |
|---|---|---|
| Weinert 72'; Stegleder 96'; McCain 104' | Report | Corbin 45+1' |

Lexington SC Stadium, Lexington, Kentucky, U.S.
Attendance: 7,715
Referee: Shawn Tehini

====== 2026 Fall ======
Regular season

| Pos | Team | Pld | W | L | T | GF | GA | GD | Pts | Qualification |
|---|---|---|---|---|---|---|---|---|---|---|
| 1 | Carolina Ascent FC | 13 | 8 | 2 | 3 | 20 | 9 | +11 | 27 | Playoffs |
| 2 | DC Power FC | 13 | 7 | 3 | 3 | 21 | 12 | +9 | 24 | Playoffs |
| 3 | Sporting Club Jacksonville | 13 | 5 | 2 | 6 | 26 | 20 | +6 | 21 | Playoffs |
| 4 | Lexington SC | 12 | 5 | 5 | 2 | 20 | 13 | +7 | 17 | Playoffs |
| 5 | Dallas Trinity FC | 11 | 4 | 4 | 3 | 14 | 14 | 0 | 15 | |
| 6 | Brooklyn FC | 12 | 3 | 6 | 3 | 13 | 25 | −12 | 12 | |
| 7 | Tampa Bay Sun FC | 11 | 2 | 5 | 4 | 11 | 16 | −5 | 10 | |
| 8 | Fort Lauderdale United FC | 13 | 2 | 9 | 2 | 7 | 23 | −16 | 8 | |

Updated to match(es) played on November 21, 2026. Source: USL Super League
Rules for classification: 1) head-to-head points; 2) total goal differential; 3) total goals scored; 4) disciplinary points; 5) drawing of lots.

==== Cup competitions ====
===== NWSL Challenge Cup =====
June 26, 2026
8:00 pm EDT

| Gotham FC | 2–0 | Kansas City Current |
|---|---|---|
| González 37' (pen.); Dudley 79' | Report |

ScottsMiracle-Gro Field, Columbus, Ohio
Attendance: 11,369
Referee: Brad Jensen

==== International competitions ====
===== FIFA Women's Champions Cup =====
Semi-finals

| Team 1 | Score | Team 2 |
|---|---|---|
| Gotham FC (United States) | 0–1 | (Brazil) Corinthians |

3rd Place

| Team 1 | Score | Team 2 |
|---|---|---|
| AS FAR (Morocco) | 0–4 | (United States) Gotham FC |

==== CONCACAF competitions ====
===== CONCACAF W Championship Cup =====
Group

| Pos | Team | Pld | W | D | L | GF | GA | GD | Pts | Qualification | AME | PAC | ORL | ALA | CHO |
|---|---|---|---|---|---|---|---|---|---|---|---|---|---|---|---|
| 1 | (Mexico) América | 4 | 3 | 1 | 0 | 12 | 0 | +12 | **10** | Advance to knockout stage | — | 1–0 | 2–0 | — | — |
| 2 | (Mexico) Pachuca | 4 | 2 | 1 | 1 | 12 | 2 | +10 | **7** | Advance to knockout stage | — | — | — | 5–0 | 6–0 |
| 3 | (United States) Orlando Pride | 4 | 2 | 1 | 1 | 9 | 3 | +6 | **7** | | — | 1–1 | — | 3–0 | — |
| 4 | (Costa Rica) Alajuelense | 4 | 1 | 1 | 2 | 1 | 8 | −7 | **4** | | 0–0 | — | — | — | 1–0 |
| 5 | (Panama) Chorrillo | 4 | 0 | 0 | 4 | 0 | 21 | −21 | **0** | | 0–9 | — | 0–5 | — | — |

Source: CONCACAF
Rules for classification: Tiebreakers

| Pos | Team | Pld | W | D | L | GF | GA | GD | Pts | Qualification | WAS | GFC | MON | VNR | ALI |
|---|---|---|---|---|---|---|---|---|---|---|---|---|---|---|---|
| 1 | (United States) Washington Spirit | 4 | 3 | 1 | 0 | 15 | 0 | +15 | **10** | Advance to knockout stage | — | — | 4–0 | 4–0 | — |
| 2 | (United States) Gotham FC | 4 | 3 | 1 | 0 | 8 | 2 | +6 | **10** | Advance to knockout stage | 0–0 | — | 2–1 | — | — |
| 3 | (Mexico) Monterrey | 4 | 2 | 0 | 2 | 13 | 6 | +7 | **6** | | — | — | — | 4–0 | 8–0 |
| 4 | (Canada) Vancouver Rise Academy | 4 | 1 | 0 | 3 | 9 | 12 | −3 | **3** | | — | 1–4 | — | — | 8–0 |
| 5 | (El Salvador) Alianza | 4 | 0 | 0 | 4 | 0 | 25 | −25 | **0** | | 0–7 | 0–2 | — | — | — |

Source: CONCACAF
Rules for classification: Tiebreakers

Knockout stage
Semi-finals

| Team 1 | Score | Team 2 |
|---|---|---|
| América (Mexico) | 4–1 | (United States) Gotham FC |
| Washington Spirit (United States) | 1–0 | (Mexico) Pachuca |

Third Place

| Team 1 | Score | Team 2 |
|---|---|---|
| Gotham FC (United States) | 0–3 | (Mexico) Pachuca |

Final

23 May 2026
19:30 UTC−6

| América (Mexico) | 5–3 | (United States) Washington Spirit |
|---|---|---|
| Aviléz 22'; Geyse 27', 61'; Guerrero 79'; Morgan 90+6' (o.g.) | Report | Cantore 30'; Kouassi 46', 58' |

Estadio Hidalgo, Pachuca
Attendance: 9,035
Referee: Carly Shaw-MacLaren (Canada)

== Honors ==
=== Professional ===
Men
| Competition | | Winner |
|---|---|---|
| U.S. Open Cup | | St. Louis City SC |
| MLS Supporters' Shield | | Nashville SC |
| MLS Cup | | |
| USL Championship | Players' Shield | Tampa Bay Rowdies |
| USL Championship | Playoffs | Sacramento Republic FC |
| MLS Next Pro | Regular season | Austin FC II |
| MLS Next Pro | Playoffs | Charlotte FC |
| USL League One | Players' Shield | Charlotte Independence |
| USL League One | Playoffs | Charlotte Independence |
| USL Jägermeister Cup | | Louisville City |

Women
| Competition | | Winner |
|---|---|---|
| NWSL Challenge Cup | | Gotham FC |
| National Women's Soccer League | | Kansas City Current |
| NWSL Shield | | Gotham FC |
| 2025–26 USL Super League | Regular season | Lexington SC |
| 2025–26 USL Super League | Playoffs | Lexington SC |
| 2026 USL Super League | Regular season | |
| 2026 USL Super League | Playoffs | |

=== Amateur ===
Men
| Competition | Team |
|---|---|
| USL League Two | Vermont Green |
| National Premier Soccer League | El Farolito |
| The League for Clubs | Pensacola |
| United Premier Soccer League | Deportivo Rose City |
| National Amateur Cup | El Farolito |
| NCAA Division I Soccer Championship | |
| NCAA Division II Soccer Championship | |
| NCAA Division III Soccer Championship | |
| NAIA Soccer Championship | |

Women
| Competition | Team |
|---|---|
| United Women's Soccer | |
| USL W League | Salmon Bay |
| Women's Premier Soccer League | KC Current II |
| National Amateur Cup | Rochester Lazers |
| NCAA Division I Soccer Championship | |
| NCAA Division II Soccer Championship | |
| NCAA Division III Soccer Championship | |
| NAIA Soccer Championship | |
