= Commonwealth Cup (soccer rivalry) =

- Other names: El Bluegrassico, The Bourbon Brawl, The Kentucky Derby Derby
- Sport: Soccer
- Type: Inner-State Derby
- Teams: Lexington SC; Louisville City
- First meeting: April 5, 2023; U.S. Open Cup Louisville 1–0 Lexington
- Latest meeting: July 11, 2026; USL Cup; Louisville 4 – 2 Lexington
- Stadiums: Lexington SC Stadium; Lexington, Kentucky Lynn Family Stadium; Louisville, Kentucky

Statistics
- Total meetings: 6
- All-time record: Louisville leads series: 6–0–0
- Largest victory: Louisville City 2–0 Lexington SC (April 5, 2023)
- Current win streak: Louisville City (6)
- Current unbeaten streak: Louisville City (6)
- Location of the two teams in Kentucky

The Commonwealth Cup, officially called The Commonwealth Cup Presented By Republic Bank for sponsorship reasons, is a soccer rivalry between the two American United Soccer League (USL) teams in the Commonwealth of Kentucky, Louisville City FC and Lexington SC. Currently, both teams play in the USL Championship. As of July 2025, both teams have played each other in the USL Championship Regular Season, The Lamar Hunt U.S. Open Cup, the USL Cup and in preseason friendlies.

The rivalry is a manifestation of a greater cultural rivalry between the cities of Lexington and Louisville. As the two largest cities in the Kentucky, Lexington and Louisville are major cultural hubs for the state, with both cities being the principal cities of the first and second largest metropolitan areas in Kentucky. The two major universities in each city have a fierce rivalry between themselves, with the University of Kentucky Wildcats (Lexington) and the University of Louisville Cardinals rivalry considered one of the most intense in the country. As of July 2025, both teams play for a physical trophy presented by Republic Bank.

== Background ==
Louisville City was founded in 2014, and has been considered one the USL's premier clubs. Louisville City has won two USL Championships and remains near the top of the USL's ranking for average attendance. Louisville developed two fierce rivalries with FC Cincinnati and Saint Louis FC, but due to MLS expansion, Louisville was left without an established rivalry to compete in within their league.

Lexington SC was founded in 2021, joining the USL League One, the third division of American soccer. To support the new club, the City of Lexington announced it would be assisting in building a new soccer stadium and complex around the team, expecting to host around 5,000 fans. The stadium, named Lexington SC Stadium, was completed in the middle of the 2024 season.

== History ==
In their first match, before Lexington SC was promoted, Louisville City and Lexington met in the 2nd Round of the 2023 U.S. Open Club. Louisville City soundly beat Lexington 1–0. Louisville outshot and outpossessed Lexington in both halves of the game.

In January 2024, Lexington SC announced it was signing former Louisville City captain and all-time club leading scorer Cameron Lancaster. He was later announced to be Lexington SC's captain.

In 2025, it was announced that the rivalry would be officially called "The Commonwealth Cup Presented By Republic Bank." The trophy was first awarded on July 26, 2025, after Louisville defeated Lexington 2–1. During the match, Lexington wore their "Icicles Kit," a kit to honor the University of Kentucky's 1990s basketball teams who wore similar uniforms. The game would be highlighted as Lexington SC's first ever sell-out game, a record attendance for the rivalry at 8,252. Louisville won the match, and ultimately secured the Commonwealth Cup, with Louisville's Jake Morris scoring a brace, scoring both goals in stoppage time.

== Statistics ==
=== Head-to-head record ===
Season	Date	Competition	Stadium	Home team	Result	Away team	Goal scorers	Attendance	Series	Ref
2023	April 5	U.S. Open Cup	Lynn Family Stadium	Louisville City FC	1–0	Lexington SC	(LOU) (Totsch 69)	4,205	LOU 1–0–0	
2025	May 1	USL Championship	Lynn Family Stadium	Louisville City FC	2–0	Lexington SC	(LOU) (Gilbert 67), (LOU) (Goodrum 81)	8,233	LOU 2–0–0	
2025	July 26	USL Jägermeister Cup	Lexington SC Stadium	Lexington SC	1–2	Louisville City FC	(LEX) (Greene 87), (LOU) (Morris 90+1), (LOU) (Morris 90+7)	8,252	LOU 3–0–0	
2026	March 6	USL Championship	Lexington SC Stadium	Lexington SC	1–2	Louisville City FC	(LEX) (Molloy 18), (LOU) (Akale 52), (LOU) ( McFadden 85)	8,277	LOU 4–0–0	
2026	April 1	Lamar Hunt US Open Cup	Lexington SC Stadium	Lexington SC	0–2	Louisville City FC	(LOU) (Niang 23), (LOU) ( Showunmi 52)	4,406	LOU 5–0–0	
2026	July 11	Prinx Tires USL Cup	Lynn Family Stadium	Louisville City FC	4-2	Lexington SC	(LEX) (Braudílio Rodrigues 12), (LOU) (Wilson Harris 28), (LOU) (Chris Donovan 34), (LEX) (Xavier Zengue 43), (LOU) (Wilson Harris 59), (LOU) (Javain Brown OG 73)	9,487	LOU 6–0–0	

=== All-time leading scorers ===
Player	Team	Goals Scored
Jake Morris	Louisville City	2 (2025)
Jacob Greene	Lexington SC	1 (2025)

=== Players that have played for both clubs ===
Note: Flags indicate national team as defined under FIFA eligibility rules; some limited exceptions apply. Players may hold more than one non-FIFA nationality.

No.	Pos.	Nation	Player
7	FW	USA	Issac Cano
17	FW	ENG	Cameron Lancaster (C) (Captained both teams)
80	MF	JAM	Devon Williams
9	FW	USA	Phillip Goodrum
7	CB	ESP	Arturo Ordoñez
