= 2026 National Amateur Cup =

102st edition of cup competition in American soccer

2026 USASA National Amateur Cup
Tournament details
- Country: United States
- Teams: 38

Tournament statistics
- Matches played: 47
- Goals scored: 229 (4.87 per match)
- All statistics correct as of 00:36, July 6, 2026 (UTC).

The 2026 National Amateur Cup is the 102nd edition of the National Amateur Cup, a knockout cup competition open to amateur teams affiliated with the United States Adult Soccer Association (USASA). It was the eighth edition of the tournament to award its men's champion a spot in the U.S. Open Cup.

West Chester United SC (PA) and Pan World Elite WFC (UT) are the defending Men's and Women's National Amateur Cup champions, respectively.

== Format ==
Each of the USASA's four regions hold qualifying tournaments to determine a regional champion. The format of the qualifying tournament is left to the discretion of each region with the minimum requirement of either a group of four teams each playing three games or an eight-game elimination tournament. A single-elimination tournament is the most common format used. The four regional champions then compete in a single-elimination tournament at a neutral location to determine the national champion.

== Region I ==
=== Region I men's tournament ===
In total, sixteen teams across seven state associations in USASA Region I and the National Premier Soccer League sent representatives to the tournament for the Fitz Marth Amateur Cup. Pennsylvania was the most represented state in the tournament with three teams taking part.

The final of the regional tournament will take place on June 6 at the Ukrainian American Sports Center in North Wales, Pennsylvania.

Bracket

As of June 6, 2026.

Home teams listed on top of bracket

First Round; March 22–29
NJ	**SC Vistula Garfield**	**FF**
NH	Beech St. FC
**NY**	**Leros**	**3**
NJ	Hoboken	0
MA	South Coast Union	0
**NY**	**Lansdowne Yonkers FC**	**4**
MA	**Loco Gunners**	**FF**
MA	Santa Cruz FC
MD	Ristozi FC
VA	**Club Atlético Los Toros**	**FF**
PA	**West Chester United SC (USLPA)**	**FF**
MD	Baltimore City FC
**MD**	**Christos FC**	**5**
PA	Jugadores	0
VA	Syndicate	1
**PA**	**Vereinigung Erzgebirge**	**5**

Quarterfinals; April 19–26
**NJ**	**Leros**	**4**
NJ	SC Vistula Garfield	1
MA	Loco Gunners	0
**NY**	**Lansdowne Yonkers FC**	**3**
PA	West Chester United SC (USLPA)	0
**VA**	**Club Atlético Los Toros**	**3**
MD	Christos FC	1
**PA**	**Vereinigung Erzgebirge**	**5**

Semifinals; May 10–17
NJ	Leros	1
**NY**	**Lansdowne Yonkers FC**	**2**
**VA**	**Club Atlético Los Toros**	**4**
PA	Vereinigung Erzgebirge	2

Final; June 6
**NY**	**Lansdowne Yonkers FC**	**3**
VA	Club Atlético Los Toros	0

Bold = winner
* = after extra time, ( ) = penalty shootout score, FF = forfeit

=== Region I women's tournament ===
Pos	Team	Pld	W	D	L	GF	GA	GD	Pts	Qualification
1	Rochester Lazers (WNY) (C)	3	3	0	0	10	3	+7	**9**	Champions
2	Central Park Rangers (ENY)	3	2	0	1	11	1	+10	**6**	
3	Garden City FC (MA)	3	1	0	2	5	4	+1	**3**	
4	Rhode Island Soccer League (RI)	3	0	0	3	1	19	−18	**0**	

Updated to match(es) played on June 7, 2026. Source: https://www.theleaguefc.com/news/west-region-schedule-announcement
(C) Champions

==== Results ====
Home \ Away	CPR	GAR	RHO	ROC
Central Park Rangers (ENY)	—		8–0	
Garden City FC (MA)	0–2	—	4–0	
Rhode Island Soccer League (RI)			—	
Rochester Lazers (WNY)	2–1* (Note: Game ended in draw, but win was awarded by shootout)	2–1	7–1	—

Updated to match(es) played on June 7, 2026. Source: https://www.theleaguefc.com/news/west-region-schedule-announcement
Legend: Blue = home team win; Yellow = draw; Red = away team win.

== Region II ==
=== Region II men's tournament ===
In total, 18 teams across six state associations in USASA Region II and the National Premier Soccer League sent representatives to the tournament for the Bill Davey Amateur Cup. Michigan and Wisconsin are the most represented states in the tournament with four teams each taking part.

The final of the regional tournament will take place on May 31.

Note: Separate draws were held for rounds 1, 2, and the Quarterfinals.

Bracket

As of June 2, 2026.

Home teams listed on top of bracket

Round 1 March 23–April 7
**MI**	**Drita Soccer Club**	**5**
MI	Ypsilanti Athletic FC	4
MI	Monroe United	2
**MI**	**Livonia City FC**	**6**
**IL**	**Chicago House AC**	**4**
WI	RKC Third Coast	1
MN	Vlora FC	2
**MN**	**Minnesota Blizzard FC**	**4**
WI	Bavarian United SC	3
**WI**	**United Serbian SC**	**4**
WI	**Green Bay Glory**	**FF**
MN	Camargo FC (Note: Carmargo FC forfeit)
OH	Valhalla FC (Note: Valhalla FC forfeit)
IN	**1927 SC**	**FF**
**IN**	**Goshen City FC**	**4***
IL	Steel City FC	1

Round 2 April 10–May 3
**MI**	**Drita Soccer Club**	**9**
MI	Livonia City SC	0
IL	**Chicago House AC** (Note: Chicago House AC was initially disqualified after first round, but won the appeal, which pushed back the date of the second round game)	**FF**
MN	Minnesota Blizard FC (Note: Minnesota Blizzard FC forfeit after date change)
WI	United Serbian SC	1
**WI**	**Green Bay Glory**	**8**
IN	1927 SC	0
**IN**	**Goshen City FC**	**1**

Quarterfinals; May 3
MI	**Drita Soccer Club**
BYE
IL	**Chicago House AC**
Bye
WI	FC Milwaukee Torrent	2
**WI**	**Green Bay Glory**	**3***
**IL**	**RWB Adria**	**4**
IN	Goshen City SC	0

Semifinals; May 16–May 17
MI	Drita Soccer Club	2
**IL**	**Chicago House AC**	**3**
WI	Green Bay Glory	0
**IL**	**RWB Adria**	**3**

Finals; May 31
**IL**	**Chicago House AC**	**1(3)**
IL	RWB Adria	1(2)

Bold = winner
* = after extra time, ( ) = penalty shootout score, FF = forfeit

== Region III ==
In total, four teams across four state associations in USASA Region III sent representatives to the tournament. Region III held its tournament over one weekend on May 30–31 at Richard Siegel Soccer Complex in Murfreesboro, Tennessee. All four teams played a round–robin tournament prior to a single match final between the two best teams.

Round Robin

Pos	Team	Pld	W	D	L	GF	GA	GD	Pts	Qualification
1	Arkansas Wolves FC	3	2	1	0	5	3	+2	7	Playoffs
2	(North Carolina) Tar Devils SC (C)	3	2	0	1	15	2	+13	6	Playoffs
3	(Tennessee) Strikers	3	1	0	2	5	13	−8	3	
4	(Georgia (U.S. state)) Terminus FC	3	0	1	2	2	9	−7	1	

Source: Match reports
(C) Champions

Home \ Away	ARK	STR	TAR	TER
Arkansas Wolves FC	—	3–2		1–1
Strikers		—	0–10	
Tar Devils SC	0–1		—	5–1
Terminus FC		0–3		—

Source: Match reports
Legend: Blue = home team win; Yellow = draw; Red = away team win.

Notes

Knockout Stage

Final; May 31
NC	Tar Devils SC	1
AR	Arkansas Wolves FC	0

== Region IV ==
In total, twelve teams across five state associations in USASA Region IV sent representatives to the tournament. The Greater Salt Lake Soccer League was the most represented league in the region with three teams participating. Utah was the most represented state in the tournament with three teams taking part.

=== Men's ===
==== Group A ====
Pos	Team	Pld	W	D	L	GF	GA	GD	Pts	Qualification
1	(California) El Farolito SC (C)	4	2	1	1	11	0	+11	23	Playoffs
2	(California) Vacaville Elite	3	2	0	1	13	8	+5	19	
3	(Idaho) Bowaze FC	3	1	1	1	5	5	0	15	

Updated to match(es) played on June 27, 2026. Source:
(C) Champions

==== Group B ====
Pos	Team	Pld	W	D	L	GF	GA	GD	Pts	Qualification
1	(Utah) Olympique Montreux (Q)	3	1	0	2	8	12	−4	14	Playoffs
2	(Colorado) Peak XI	3	1	1	1	6	11	−5	14	
3	(New Mexico) Sun City FC	3	0	1	2	0	6	−6	4	

Updated to match(es) played on June 26, 2026. Source:
(Q) Qualified for the phase indicated

==== Group C ====
Pos	Team	Pld	W	D	L	GF	GA	GD	Pts	Qualification
1	(Nevada) Sin City FC (Q)	3	2	0	1	10	5	+5	20	Playoffs
2	(California) Temecula FC	3	1	1	1	12	8	+4	17	
3	(Nevada) Rebels United FC	3	1	0	2	5	3	+2	11	

Updated to match(es) played on June 26, 2026. Source:
(Q) Qualified for the phase indicated

==== Group D ====
Pos	Team	Pld	W	D	L	GF	GA	GD	Pts	Qualification
1	(California) Cal South Saturdays (Q)	3	3	0	0	6	2	+4	25	Playoffs
2	(California) Vikings SC	3	1	1	1	11	12	−1	15	
3	(Utah) Kita FC	3	0	0	3	0	11	−11	0	

Updated to match(es) played on June 26, 2026. Source:
(Q) Qualified for the phase indicated

Home \ Away	BOW	CSS	ELF	KIT	OLY	PEA	REB	SIN	SUN	TEM	VAC	VIK
Bowaze FC	—				0–3				3–0			
Cal South Saturdays		—								3–1		
El Farolito SC			—			7–0			0–0			
Kita FC				—				0–3				
Olympique Montreux			1–4		—							
Peak XI						—						
Rebels United FC		0–1		3–0			—					
Sin City FC		1–2						—				6–3
Sun City FC									—		0–3	
Temecula FC				5–0						—		5–5
Vacaville Elite					8–4	2–4					—	
Vikings SC							3–1					—

Updated to match(es) played on June 26, 2026. Source: Match reports
Legend: Blue = home team win; Yellow = draw; Red = away team win.

=== Knockout Stage ===
Semi-final; June 28
A	El Farolito SC	3
D	Cal South Saturdays	2
B	Olympique Montreux	1
C	Sin City FC	7

Finals; June 28
A	El Farolito SC	3
C	Sin City FC	0

=== Women's ===
==== Group A ====
Pos	Team	Pld	W	D	L	GF	GA	GD	Pts	Qualification
1	(Idaho) Boise Thorns	0	0	0	0	0	0	0	0	Playoffs
2	(Utah) Pan World Elite WFC	0	0	0	0	0	0	0	0	
3	(Nevada) Rebels WFC	0	0	0	0	0	0	0	0	

First match(es) will be played: June 26, 2026. Source:

==== Group B ====
Pos	Team	Pld	W	D	L	GF	GA	GD	Pts	Qualification
1	Fire SC	0	0	0	0	0	0	0	0	Playoffs
2	(Utah) Mayhem WFC	0	0	0	0	0	0	0	0	
3	Valkyrie	0	0	0	0	0	0	0	0	

First match(es) will be played: June 26, 2026. Source:

Home \ Away	BOI	FIR	MAY	PAN	REB	VAL
Boise Thorns	—					6/26
Fire SC		—		6/27		6/28
Mayhem WFC		6/26	—		6/28	
Pan World Elite WFC	6/28			—		6/26
Rebels WFC	6/27				—	
Valkyrie			6/27			—

Legend: Blue = home team win; Yellow = draw; Red = away team win.

Notes

Knockout Stage

Final; June 28
Group A
Group B

== National Amateur Cup Finals ==
The National Amateur Cup Finals will be held July 24–25 at Uihlein Soccer Park in Milwaukee, Wisconsin

=== Men's Final ===
**Semifinals**; July 24
**R1**	**Lansdowne Yonkers FC**	**5**
R3	Tar Devils SC	1
R2	Chicago House AC	0
**R4**	**El Farolito SC**	**2**

**Final**; July 25
R1	Lansdowne Yonkers FC	1
**R4**	**El Farolito SC**	**3***

=== Women's final ===
**Semifinals**; July 24
NY	**Rochester Lazers**	**FF**
TN	Tristar’s
**WI**	**Milwaukee Torrent**	**3**
UT	Pan World Elite	0

**Final**; July 25
**NY**	**Rochester Lazers**	**1**
WI	Milwaukee Torrent	0

Bold = winner
* = after extra time, ( ) = penalty shootout score, FF = forfeit -->
