= Jake Morris =

Jake Morris may refer to:

- Jake Morris (hurler) (born 1999), Irish hurler
- Jake Morris (soccer) (born 1999), American soccer player
