= Sophia Ahrens =

German-English fashion model

- Born: Sophia Ahrens; 4 January 1996 (age 30); Hamburg, Germany
- Occupation: Fashion model
- Modeling information
- Height: 1.80 m (5 ft 11 in)
- Hair color: Brown
- Eye color: Hazel
- Agency: Elite Model Management (New York City); Oui Management (Paris); Monster Management (Milan); The Hive Management (London); Future Faces Model Mgmt (Amsterdam); Le Management (Copenhagen)

Sophia Ahrens is a German-English fashion model.

== Early life ==
Ahrens was born in Hamburg to a German father and an English mother and grew up mainly in England. She was scouted at age 12 by Laura Murphy (The Hive Management) in January 2015) while Christmas shopping in a London mall.

== Career ==
As of 2015, Ahrens is currently signed to DNA Model Management. Ahrens is one of the faces of Paco Rabanne. She has modeled for Giorgio Armani, Prada and Claudie Pierlot. In 2014, she was the face of the perfume “Daisy“ by Marc Jacobs.

In the 2015 F/W season, she ranked 8 on the list of top models, according to MADAME, a German fashion magazine

In August 2018, Ahrens was on the cover of Elle Italia, as well as doing various editorials.
