= Chris Donovan =

Chris Donovan may refer to:

- Chris Donovan (director)
- Chris Donovan (soccer)

== See also ==
- Christopher G. Donovan , American politician
