= Sandoval =

Sandoval is a habitational surname of Spanish origin. It primarily originates from Sandoval de la Reina, Spain, earlier called Sannoval, which is a blend word of Latin saltus (meaning 'grove' or 'wood') and Latin novalis (meaning 'newly cleared land').

== People with the surname ==
- Aarón Sandoval, Mexican footballer
- Andrew Sandoval, American songwriter, musician, producer and author
- Angelina Sandoval-Gutierrez (born 1938), Filipino jurist
- Arturo Sandoval, Cuban Latin-jazz musician
- Brian Sandoval (born 1963), American politician, Republican governor of Nevada
- Carla Sandoval (born 1982), Chilean pianist
- Carlos Sandoval (born 1956), Mexican-German composer, musician and sound artist
- Carlos Ramírez Sandoval (1939–2016), Mexican museum director and curator
- Carmen Barajas Sandoval (1925–2014), Mexican aristocrat, film executive producer, bestselling author
- Cristóbal de Sandoval, Duke of Uceda (1581–1624), minister of state for Philip III of Spain
- Danny Sandoval (born 1979), Venezuelan baseball infielder
- Diego de Sandoval (1505–1580), Spanish explorer and conquistador
- Dominic Sandoval, American dancer and YouTube personality
- Elman Joel Sandoval, Honduran politician
- Esther Sandoval (1927–2006), Puerto Rican actress
- Eva Contreras Sandoval (born 1956), Mexican politician
- Federico Sandoval II, known as Ricky Sandoval, Filipino congressman
- Francisco de Sandoval Acacitzin (died 1554), native ruler of Itzcahuacan in Mexico after the Spanish conquest
- Francisco Gómez de Sandoval, 1st Duke of Lerma (1552/53–1625), a favorite of Philip III of Spain
- Freddy Sandoval (born 1982), Mexican baseball player
- Fulvia Celica Siguas Sandoval, Peruvian transsexual woman
- Gerardo Sandoval (born 1962), judge of the Superior Court of California
- Gidget Sandoval, Costa Rican Miss International for 1983
- Gonzalo de Sandoval (1497–1528), Spanish conquistador in New Spain
- Hernán Sandoval (born 1983), Guatemalan football striker
- Horacio Sandoval (born 1971), Mexican comic book artist
- Hope Sandoval, American singer-songwriter
- Irma Sandoval Ballesteros, Mexican academic
- Isabel Sandoval, Filipina filmmaker and actress
- Jery Sandoval (born 1986), Colombian actress, model and singer
- Jesse Sandoval, American drummer, formerly of The Shins
- José León Sandoval, President of Nicaragua from 1845–47
- Juan Sandoval Íñiguez (born 1933), Roman Catholic cardinal and archbishop, from Mexico
- Julio Terrazas Sandoval (1936–2015), Roman Catholic cardinal and archbishop, from Bolivia
- Kevin Sandoval (Guatemalan footballer) (born 1962), Guatemalan footballer
- Kevin Sandoval (Peruvian footballer) (born 1997), Peruvian footballer
- Luciana Sandoval (born 1980), Salvadoran television presenter, dancer and model
- Luis Sandoval (disambiguation)
- Manuel de Sandoval, Neomexican soldier, governor of Coahuila (1729–1733) and Texas
- Manuel Sandoval Vallarta, Mexican physicist
- Marlene Sandoval, known as Rubí Sandoval, Mexican footballer
- Martin Sandoval (1964–2020), American politician; Democratic member of the Illinois Senate
- Mary Sandoval, American mathematician
- Merril Sandoval (1925–2008), American Navajo World War II veteran
- Miguel Sandoval (born 1951), American film and television actor
- Miguel Sandoval (composer) (1903–1953), Guatemalan film composer
- Pablo Sandoval, Venezuelan professional baseball player
- Patrick Sandoval (born 1996), American professional baseball player
- Pete Sandoval, Salvadoran-born American drummer of the band Morbid Angel
- Raúl Sandoval, Mexican actor and singer
- Richie Sandoval (1960-2024), American boxer
- Roberto Parra Sandoval (1921–1995), Chilean singer-songwriter, guitarist and folklorist
- Rolo Sandoval, American musician and drummer, co founder of Beatles tribute The Fab Four
- Samy and Sandra Sandoval, Panamanian musical duo
- Santiago Cristóbal Sandoval, Mexican sculptor
- Shaina Sandoval (born 1992), American actress
- Sonny Sandoval, American lead singer of the band P.O.D.
- Teresita Sandoval (1811–1894) a founder of Pueblo, Colorado
- Tom Sandoval, cast member from Vanderpump Rules
- Tony Sandoval (born 1954), American marathon runner
- Valeska Sandoval, Nicaraguan student
- Vicente Cerna Sandoval, president of Guatemala 1865–71
- Wellington Sandoval, Ecuadorian surgeon and former politician

== Fictional characters with the surname ==
- Carlos Sandoval, a recurring character of Walker, Texas Ranger and the protagonist of its spinoff Sons of Thunder.
- Ronald Sandoval, a primary antagonist in Earth: Final Conflict, and the only character to appear in all 5 seasons.

== People with the given name ==
- Sandoval (footballer, born 1969), Sandoval Luiz de Oliveira, Brazilian footballer.
- Sandoval (footballer, born 1986), Sandoval Araújo Lima, Brazilian footballer.

== See also ==
- Senator Sandoval (disambiguation)
