= List of female defence ministers =

A Ministry of Defence or Defense (see spelling differences), also known as a Department of Defence or Defense, is the common name for a part of the government found in states where the government is divided into ministries or departments, responsible for matters of defence. The title Defence Minister, Minister for Defence, Secretary of Defense, Secretary of State for Defence, Secretary of National Defense or some other titles, is assigned to the person in a cabinet position in charge of this particular ministry, which regulates the armed forces in sovereign states. The role of Minister of Defence serves an integral part in a country's military purposes. This role has traditionally been given to men because of the gender-biased nature of the military office. However, recent years have seen the appointment of female Defence Ministers. The following list shows group of women that are/were entitled with the title of Minister of Defence in charge in regulating the armed forces in their respective countries. The first woman ever entitled to this job was the then-Prime Minister of Ceylon, Sirimavo Bandaranaike, back in 1960s.

== List ==
Denotes incumbent defence minister
- Italics denotes an acting defence minister and minister of non-sovereign state

| Name | Image | Country | Continent | Mandate start | Mandate end | Term length |
|---|---|---|---|---|---|---|
| Sirimavo Bandaranaike | | Ceylon/Sri Lanka | Asia | 21 July 1960 | 25 March 1965 | 4 years, 247 days |
| Sirimavo Bandaranaike | | Ceylon/Sri Lanka | Asia | 29 May 1970 | 23 July 1977 | 7 years, 55 days |
| Indira Gandhi | | India | Asia | 30 November 1975 | 20 December 1975 | 20 days |
| Indira Gandhi | | India | Asia | 14 January 1980 | 15 January 1982 | 2 years, 1 day |
| Dame Eugenia Charles | | Dominica | North America | 1985 | 1990 | 5 years, 0 days |
| Benazir Bhutto | | Pakistan | Asia | 4 December 1988 | 6 August 1990 | 1 year, 245 days |
| Violeta Chamorro | | Nicaragua | North America | 25 April 1990 | 10 January 1997 | 6 years, 260 days |
| Elisabeth Rehn | | Finland | Europe | 13 June 1990 | 1 January 1995 | 4 years, 202 days |
| Khaleda Zia | | Bangladesh | Asia | 27 February 1991 | 30 March 1996 | 5 years, 32 days |
| Khaleda Zia | | Bangladesh | Asia | 1 October 2001 | 29 October 2006 | 5 years, 28 days |
| Kim Campbell | | Canada | North America | 4 January 1993 | 25 June 1993 | 172 days |
| Chandrika Kumaratunga | | Sri Lanka | Asia | 14 November 1994 | 12 December 2001 | 7 years, 28 days |
| Anneli Taina | | Finland | Europe | 13 April 1995 | 15 April 1999 | 4 years, 2 days |
| Sheikh Hasina | | Bangladesh | Asia | 12 June 1996 | 15 July 2001 | 5 years, 33 days |
| Sheikh Hasina | | Bangladesh | Asia | 6 January 2009 | 5 August 2024 | 15 years, 212 days |
| Laura Chinchilla Miranda | | Costa Rica (Note: In Costa Rica, Ministry of Public Security is in charge of maintaining public order, organizing police forces, preventing crime and, if necessary, defending national sovereignty.) | North America | 12 November 1996 | 8 May 1998 | 1 year, 175 days |
| Laura Chinchilla Miranda | | Costa Rica | North America | 30 March 2008 | 14 April 2008 | 15 days |
| Regina Ip | | Hong Kong | Asia | 31 August 1998 | 25 July 2003 | 4 years, 328 days |
| Eldbjørg Løwer | | Norway | Europe | 15 March 1999 | 10 March 2000 | 361 days |
| Joice Mujuru | | Zimbabwe | Africa | 8 June 2001 | 8 August 2001 | 61 days |
| Kristin Krohn Devold | | Norway | Europe | 19 October 2001 | 17 October 2005 | 3 years, 363 days |
| Michelle Bachelet | | Chile | South America | 7 January 2002 | 1 October 2004 | 2 years, 268 days |
| Cynthia A. Pratt | | Bahamas | North America | 7 May 2002 | 4 May 2007 | 4 years, 362 days |
| Michèle Alliot-Marie | | France | Europe | 7 May 2002 | 18 May 2007 | 5 years, 11 days |
| Željka Antunović | | Croatia | Europe | 30 July 2002 | 23 December 2003 | 1 year, 146 days |
| Marta Lucía Ramírez | | Colombia | South America | 7 August 2002 | 9 November 2003 | 1 year, 94 days |
| Lena Hjelm-Wallén | | Sweden | Europe | 30 September 2002 | 22 October 2002 | 22 days |
| Mame Madior Boye | | Senegal | Africa | 2 October 2002 | 4 November 2002 | 33 days |
| Leni Björklund | | Sweden | Europe | 4 November 2002 | 6 October 2006 | 3 years, 336 days |
| Sylvia Flores | | Belize | North America | 5 March 2003 | 5 January 2004 | 306 days |
| Filomena Mascarenhas Tipote | | Guinea-Bissau | Africa | 23 April 2003 | 12 May 2004 | 1 year, 19 days |
| Gloria Macapagal Arroyo | | Philippines | Asia | 1 September 2003 | 2 October 2003 | 31 days |
| Gloria Macapagal Arroyo | | Philippines | Asia | 30 November 2006 | 1 February 2007 | 63 days |
| Azucena Berrutti | | Uruguay | South America | 1 March 2005 | 3 March 2008 | 3 years, 2 days |
| Anne-Grete Strøm-Erichsen | | Norway | Europe | 17 October 2005 | 20 October 2009 | 4 years, 3 days |
| Anne-Grete Strøm-Erichsen | | Norway | Europe | 21 September 2012 | 16 October 2013 | 1 year, 25 days |
| Nilda Garré | | Argentina | South America | 28 November 2005 | 15 December 2010 | 5 years, 17 days |
| Solvita Āboltiņa | | Latvia | Europe | 23 December 2005 | 5 January 2006 | 13 days |
| Linda Abu Meri | | Latvia | Europe | 5 January 2006 | 7 April 2006 | 92 days |
| Cristina Fontes Lima | | Cape Verde | Africa | 8 March 2006 | 21 March 2011 | 5 years, 13 days |
| Vivianne Blanlot | | Chile | South America | 11 March 2006 | 27 March 2007 | 1 year, 16 days |
| Portia Simpson-Miller | | Jamaica | North America | 30 March 2006 | 11 September 2007 | 1 year, 165 days |
| Portia Simpson-Miller | | Jamaica | North America | 5 January 2012 | 3 March 2016 | 4 years, 58 days |
| Valgerður Sverrisdóttir | | Iceland (Note: In Iceland, the Ministry of Foreign Affairs is the central authority for national defence.) | Europe | 15 June 2006 | 24 May 2007 | 343 days |
| Vlasta Parkanová | | Czech Republic | Europe | 9 January 2007 | 8 May 2009 | 2 years, 119 days |
| Guadalupe Larriva | | Ecuador | South America | 15 January 2007 | 24 January 2007 | 9 days |
| Lorena Escudero | | Ecuador | South America | 2 February 2007 | 30 August 2007 | 209 days |
| Ruth Tapia Roa | | Nicaragua | North America | 16 May 2007 | 14 May 2012 | 4 years, 364 days |
| Ingibjörg Sólrún Gísladóttir | | Iceland | Europe | 24 May 2007 | 1 February 2009 | 1 year, 253 days |
| Yuriko Koike | | Japan | Asia | 4 July 2007 | 27 August 2007 | 54 days |
| Cécile Manorohanta | | Madagascar | Africa | 27 October 2007 | 9 February 2009 | 1 year, 105 days |
| Carme Chacón | | Spain | Europe | 14 April 2008 | 22 December 2011 | 3 years, 252 days |
| Janina del Vecchio Ugalde | | Costa Rica | North America | 14 April 2008 | 8 May 2010 | 1 year, 177 days |
| Elsa Teixeira Pinto | | São Tomé and Príncipe | Africa | 22 June 2008 | 14 August 2010 | 2 years, 53 days |
| Ljubica Jelušič | | Slovenia | Europe | 21 November 2008 | 10 February 2012 | 3 years, 81 days |
| Rasa Juknevičienė | | Lithuania | Europe | 9 December 2008 | 13 December 2012 | 4 years, 4 days |
| Lindiwe Sisulu | | South Africa | Africa | 10 May 2009 | 12 June 2012 | 3 years, 33 days |
| Bidhya Devi Bhandari | | Nepal | Asia | 25 May 2009 | 6 February 2011 | 1 year, 257 days |
| Angélique Ngoma | | Gabon | Africa | 17 October 2009 | 14 January 2011 | 1 year, 89 days |
| Grete Faremo | | Norway | Europe | 20 October 2009 | 11 November 2011 | 2 years, 22 days |
| Gitte Lillelund Bech | | Denmark | Europe | 23 February 2010 | 3 October 2011 | 1 year, 222 days |
| Lesego Motsumi | | Botswana | Africa | 30 August 2010 | 7 February 2011 | 161 days |
| María Cecilia Chacón | | Bolivia | South America | 6 April 2011 | 26 September 2011 | 173 days |
| Iveta Radičová | | Slovakia | Europe | 28 November 2011 | 4 April 2012 | 128 days |
| Milica Pejanović-Đurišić | | Montenegro | Europe | 13 March 2012 | 28 November 2016 | 4 years, 260 days |
| Catharina Elmsäter-Svärd | | Sweden | Europe | 29 March 2012 | 18 April 2012 | 20 days |
| Karin Enström | | Sweden | Europe | 18 April 2012 | 3 October 2014 | 2 years, 168 days |
| Maritza Pastora Membreño Morales | | Nicaragua | North America | 14 May 2012 | 4 March 2013 | 294 days |
| Nosiviwe Mapisa-Nqakula | | South Africa | Africa | 12 June 2012 | 5 August 2021 | 9 years, 54 days |
| María Liz García de Arnold | | Paraguay | South America | 25 June 2012 | 15 August 2013 | 1 year, 51 days |
| Olusola Obada | | Nigeria | Africa | 22 June 2012 | 11 September 2013 | 1 year, 81 days |
| Jeanine Hennis-Plasschaert | | Netherlands | Europe | 5 November 2012 | 3 October 2017 | 4 years, 332 days |
| María Fernanda Espinosa | | Ecuador | South America | 28 November 2012 | 23 September 2014 | 1 year, 299 days |
| Karolína Peake | | Czech Republic | Europe | 12 December 2012 | 20 December 2012 | 8 days |
| Martha Elena Ruiz Sevilla | | Nicaragua | North America | 4 March 2013 | 19 August 2019 | 6 years, 168 days |
| Raychelle Omamo | | Kenya | Africa | 15 May 2013 | 14 January 2020 | 6 years, 244 days |
| Yingluck Shinawatra | | Thailand | Asia | 30 June 2013 | 7 May 2014 | 311 days |
| Carmen Meléndez | | Venezuela | South America | 5 July 2013 | 25 October 2014 | 1 year, 112 days |
| Mimi Kodheli | | Albania | Europe | 15 September 2013 | 11 September 2017 | 3 years, 361 days |
| Ine Marie Eriksen Søreide | | Norway | Europe | 16 October 2013 | 20 October 2017 | 4 years, 4 days |
| Ursula von der Leyen | | Germany | Europe | 17 December 2013 | 17 July 2019 | 5 years, 212 days |
| Roberta Pinotti | | Italy | Europe | 22 February 2014 | 1 June 2018 | 4 years, 99 days |
| Cadi Mané | | Guinea-Bissau | Africa | 4 July 2014 | 13 October 2015 | 1 year, 101 days |
| Marie-Noëlle Koyara | | Central African Republic | Africa | 17 January 2015 | 29 October 2015 | 286 days |
| Marie-Noëlle Koyara | | Central African Republic | Africa | 12 September 2017 | 10 June 2021 | 3 years, 271 days |
| Marina Pendeš | | Bosnia and Herzegovina | Europe | 31 March 2015 | 23 December 2019 | 4 years, 315 days |
| Tina Khidasheli | | Georgia | Asia/Europe | 1 May 2015 | 30 July 2016 | 1 year, 90 days |
| Andreja Katič | | Slovenia | Europe | 13 May 2015 | 13 September 2018 | 3 years, 123 days |
| Marise Payne | | Australia | Oceania | 21 September 2015 | 26 August 2018 | 2 years, 339 days |
| Adiato Djaló Nandigna | | Guinea-Bissau | Africa | 13 October 2015 | 2 June 2016 | 233 days |
| Lilja Dögg Alfreðsdóttir | | Iceland | Europe | 7 April 2016 | 11 January 2017 | 279 days |
| Tomomi Inada | | Japan | Asia | 3 August 2016 | 28 July 2017 | 359 days |
| María Dolores de Cospedal | | Spain | Europe | 4 November 2016 | 1 June 2018 | 1 year, 209 days |
| Sylvie Goulard | | France | Europe | 17 May 2017 | 19 June 2017 | 33 days |
| Radmila Šekerinska | | North Macedonia | Europe | 1 June 2017 | 16 January 2022 | 4 years, 229 days |
| Florence Parly | | France | Europe | 21 June 2017 | 20 May 2022 | 4 years, 333 days |
| Nirmala Sitharaman | | India | Asia | 3 September 2017 | 31 May 2019 | 1 year, 270 days |
| Olta Xhaçka | | Albania | Europe | 11 September 2017 | 31 December 2020 | 3 years, 111 days |
| Ank Bijleveld | | Netherlands | Europe | 26 October 2017 | 17 September 2021 | 3 years, 326 days |
| Karla Šlechtová | | Czech Republic | Europe | 13 December 2017 | 28 June 2018 | 197 days |
| Elisabetta Trenta | | Italy | Europe | 1 June 2018 | 5 September 2019 | 1 year, 96 days |
| Margarita Robles | | Spain | Europe | 7 June 2018 | Incumbent | 8 years, 79 days |
| Oppah Muchinguri-Kashiri | | Zimbabwe | Africa | 11 September 2018 | Incumbent | 7 years, 348 days |
| Aisha Mohammed Mussa | | Ethiopia | Africa | 16 October 2018 | 18 April 2019 | 184 days |
| Mariya Ahmed Didi | | Maldives | Asia | 17 November 2018 | 17 November 2023 | 5 years, 0 days |
| Viola Amherd | | Switzerland | Europe | 1 January 2019 | 31 March 2025 | 6 years, 89 days |
| Rose Christiane Raponda | | Gabon | Africa | 12 February 2019 | 16 July 2020 | 1 year, 155 days |
| Lanelle Tanangada | | Solomon Islands | Oceania | 25 April 2019 | 10 October 2019 | 159 days |
| Penny Mordaunt | | United Kingdom | Europe | 1 May 2019 | 24 July 2019 | 84 days |
| Linda Reynolds | | Australia | Oceania | 29 May 2019 | 25 March 2021 | 1 year, 300 days |
| Trine Bramsen | | Denmark | Europe | 27 June 2019 | 4 February 2022 | 2 years, 222 days |
| Annegret Kramp-Karrenbauer | | Germany | Europe | 17 July 2019 | 8 December 2021 | 2 years, 144 days |
| Rosa Adelina Barahona Castro | | Nicaragua | North America | 21 August 2019 | Incumbent | 7 years, 4 days |
| Klaudia Tanner | | Austria | Europe | 7 January 2020 | Incumbent | 6 years, 230 days |
| Monica Juma | | Kenya | Africa | 14 January 2020 | 30 September 2021 | 1 year, 259 days |
| Zeina Akar | | Lebanon | Asia | 22 January 2020 | 10 September 2021 | 1 year, 231 days |
| Angelina Teny | | South Sudan | Africa | 12 March 2020 | 5 April 2023 | 3 years, 24 days |
| Krishna Mathoera | | Suriname | South America | 16 July 2020 | 16 July 2025 | 5 years, 0 days |
| Ludivine Dedonder | | Belgium | Europe | 1 October 2020 | 3 February 2025 | 4 years, 125 days |
| Essozimna Marguerite Gnakade | | Togo | Africa | 1 October 2020 | 23 December 2022 | 2 years, 83 days |
| Nuria Esparch | | Peru | South America | 18 November 2020 | 29 July 2021 | 253 days |
| Olivera Injac | | Montenegro | Europe | 4 December 2020 | 28 April 2022 | 1 year, 145 days |
| Thandi Modise | | South Africa | Africa | 6 August 2021 | 19 June 2024 | 2 years, 318 days |
| Stergomena Tax | | Tanzania | Africa | 13 September 2021 | 3 October 2022 | 1 year, 20 days |
| Stergomena Tax | | Tanzania | Africa | 1 September 2023 | 3 November 2025 | 2 years, 63 days |
| Anita Anand | | Canada | North America | 26 October 2021 | 26 July 2023 | 1 year, 273 days |
| Þórdís Kolbrún R. Gylfadóttir | | Iceland | Europe | 28 November 2021 | 14 October 2023 | 1 year, 320 days |
| Þórdís Kolbrún R. Gylfadóttir | | Iceland | Europe | 9 April 2024 | 21 December 2024 | 256 days |
| Christine Lambrecht | | Germany | Europe | 8 December 2021 | 19 January 2023 | 1 year, 42 days |
| Jana Černochová | | Czech Republic | Europe | 17 December 2021 | 15 December 2025 | 3 years, 363 days |
| Kajsa Ollongren | | Netherlands | Europe | 10 January 2022 | 2 July 2024 | 2 years, 174 days |
| Slavjanka Petrovska | | North Macedonia | Europe | 17 January 2022 | 23 June 2024 | 2 years, 158 days |
| Félicité Ongouori Ngoubili | | Gabon | Africa | 8 March 2022 | 30 August 2023 | 3 years, 2 days |
| Maya Fernández | | Chile | South America | 11 March 2022 | 10 March 2025 | 2 years, 364 days |
| Helena Carreiras | | Portugal | Europe | 30 March 2022 | 2 April 2024 | 2 years, 3 days |
| Ināra Mūrniece | | Latvia | Europe | 14 December 2022 | 15 September 2023 | 275 days |
| Yuriko Backes | | Luxembourg | Europe | 17 November 2023 | Incumbent | 2 years, 281 days |
| Geraldine George | | Liberia | Africa | 28 April 2024 | Incumbent | 2 years, 119 days |
| Judith Collins | | New Zealand | Oceania | 27 November 2023 | 7 April 2026 | 2 years, 131 days |
| Angie Motshekga | | South Africa | Africa | 3 July 2024 | Incumbent | 2 years, 53 days |
| Dovilė Šakalienė | | Lithuania | Europe | 12 December 2024 | 22 October 2025 | 314 days |
| Þorgerður Katrín Gunnarsdóttir | | Iceland | Europe | 21 December 2024 | Incumbent | 1 year, 247 days |
| Sandra Lazo | | Uruguay | South America | 1 March 2025 | Incumbent | 1 year, 177 days |
| Adriana Delpiano | | Chile | South America | 10 March 2025 | 11 March 2026 | 1 year, 1 day |
| Catherine Vautrin | | France | Europe | 12 October 2025 | Incumbent | 317 days |
| Helen McEntee | | Ireland | Europe | 18 November 2025 | Incumbent | 280 days |
| Dilan Yeşilgöz | | Netherlands | Europe | 23 February 2026 | Incumbent | 183 days |

== See also ==
- List of current defence ministers
- Defence diplomacy
