= Francisca Coya =

Empress of the Inca Empire

Doña Francisca Coya (1515-1543 or 1544), also known as María de Sandoval or simply La Coya, was a Princess of the Inca Empire. She was the daughter of Emperor Huayna Capac and his cousin-wife Mama Runtu Coya. She was born in Cuzco, Peru in 1515 and died in Popayán, Colombia, around 1543–44.

Fernando Jurado Noboa described her as "the nurturing mother of Ecuador and Colombia."

== Biography ==
Francisca Coya was born in Cuzco around 1515 as the legitimate daughter of Huayna Cápac and his cousin-wife Mama Runtu Coya. or of his second wife, the Puruhá Princess Paccha Duchicela, mother of Atahualpa. In spite of the uncertainty around her matrilineal origin, it is certain that her mother was a respected woman "for being an older and a principal woman in Cuzco", according to the later testimony of Pedro Inga, an Indigenous man, in Bogotá in 1575.

Numerous chronicles agree that Emperor Capac "left numerous descendants, but had few legitimate children". The parentage of Huáscar and Atahualpa remains uncertain, and the lineage of female figures such as Francisca Coya’s is even more obscure. Some claim she was the daughter of a concubine. A lack of evidence led historian Fernando Jurado Noboa to state the following about the Incan royal family: "No one questioned the maternal origin of the children of the Inca: they were children of 'Sapa Inca the Inca' and that was enough."

The Indigenous woman Catalina, who witnessed her birth and was her maid, declared in Tunja in 1575, when 70 years old, that "Guaynacaba, her father, put her in another house, where she lived with the rest of his daughters and maidens". Francisca was called "La Coya" by the first vecinos of Quito.

=== Spanish Conquest ===
After Atahualpa's death at the hands of the Spanish, in 1533, Sebastián de Benalcázar and Diego de Sandoval y la Mota invaded San Miguel de Piura. During the Spanish invasion, Coya and her people fled from Cuzco. In 1535, the Spanish found a group of indigenous people in Chaparra, in the Cañaris region of the Andes's western foothills, hiding and protecting Atahualpa's sisters Toctochembo, Marcachembom, Ascarpe, and Francisca, who were also Emperor Cápac's daughters. She and her sisters were captured and taken to Benalcázar, who "gave her [Francisca Coya] to Captain Diego de Sandoval".

She became pregnant and marched with Sandoval to Quito, where she gave birth to their only child, Eugenia de Sandoval Inca (1536-before 1575). Coya later accompanied Sandoval to Popayán, where she lived near one of her sisters (whom Benalcázar had also taken for himself).

It was said that when La Coya went to mass, all of Quito's provincial chiefs and women accompanied her, and when she left the city, she was accompanied by two to three thousand native people. Witnesses of that time said “that the Chiefs of Quito put down blankets, feathers, and flowers in front of her so that her feet would not touch the ground”. This description coincides with Canadian historian John Hemming's interpretation that "the natives of Quito venerated her with pathetic passion." According to the rituals and customs of the time, such veneration was expected for women of the Inca elite, who were refined and were treated with great respect by the people.

== Children ==
In 1536, Francisca Coya gave birth to Eugenia de Sandoval Inca in Quito. She lived with her parents in Popayán and later, after her mother's death in 1544, moved to Anserma with her father.

In 1545, Eugenia would receive the Royal Certificate of Legitimization from Charles V Holy Roman Emperor at her father Diego de Sandoval's request of "proof" (probanza) so that she could in 1550, at the age of 14, marry Captain Gil de Rengifo Pantoja. Between them, they had many descendants in Ecuador and Colombia. Eugenia died before 1575.

== Genealogy ==
Francisca Coya was the daughter of Inca Emperor Huayna Cápac and slave-wife of the Spanish conqueror Diego de Sandoval. She gave birth to Eugenia de Sandoval Inca (the emperor's granddaughter) in Quito in 1536. Eugenia de Sandoval Inca became legitimized by the Spanish King and became the wife of the colonizer Gil de Rengifo. They had one daughter, María Rengifo y Sandoval (great-granddaughter of the Inca Emperor), born in Anserma, who became the wife of the Spanish colonizer Cap. Vicente Henao Tamayo. Melchor Henao Rengifo (the Incan emperor's great-great-grandson), was born in Anserma around 1572. Around 1609, Rengifo married María Vivas in Cali. Gregorio Henao Vivas (the Incan emperor's fourth-great-grandson), was born in Cali around 1610. He moved to the city of Antioquia, where he married Jacoba Vásquez Guadramiros.

From Gregorio Henao Vivas, it is easy to follow Coya's Colombian descendants in the book titled Genealogies of Antioquia and Caldas, by Gabriel Arango Mejía. The line included people such as ex-president Roberto Urdaneta Arbeláez, archbishops Arturo Duque Villegas and Aníbal Muñoz Duque, Braulio Henao, Anselmo Pineda, Abraham Moreno, José Tomás Henao and Braulio Henao Mejía, Tomás Carrasquilla; Luis López de Mesa; León de Greiff, and Manuel Mejía Vallejo. This line of descendants is confirmed by bishop and historian Lucas Fernández de Piedrahita.

The historical and cultural values inherited by her descendants in Ecuador, such as the ex-Presidents Luis Cordero, Juan León Mera, and Antonio Borrero Cortázar, are an illustration of Doña Francisca Coya's important impact on history. Among other Ecuadorian historical figures that descend from her are Luis A. Martínez, Miguel Angel León Pontón, Octavio Cordero Palacios, Alberto María Ordonez Crespo, Carlos Concha Torres, Luis Quirola Saá, Emiliano Crespo Astudillo, Jose Maria Borrero Baca, Alfonso Borrero Moscoso, Manuel Borrero González, Vicente Salazar y Cabal, José Gabriel Pino Roca, Teodoro Luis Arroyo Robelly, Alfonso Arroyo Robelly, Pedro Cocha Torres, and Remigio Romero y Cordero.

The genealogical works demonstrate how the Incan bloodline of Francisca Coya occupy mainly the middle class spheres, but also have enriched the elite (high and middle-high classes) of colonial and republican Ecuadorian and Colombian societies.
