= Laws of the Indies =

Former Spanish empire laws

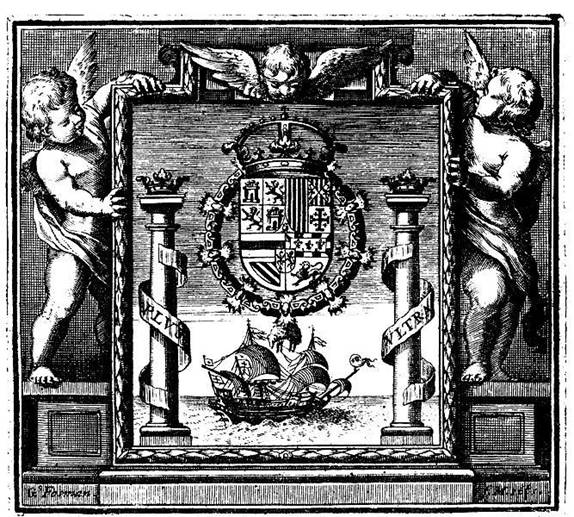
Council of the Indies royal emblem

The Laws of the Indies (Spanish: Leyes de las Indias) are the entire body of laws issued by the Spanish Crown in 1573 for the American and the Asian possessions of its empire. They regulated social, political, religious, and economic life in these areas. The laws are composed of myriad decrees issued over the centuries and the important laws of the 16th century, which attempted to regulate the interactions between the settlers and natives, such as the Laws of Burgos (1512) and the New Laws (1542). Throughout the 400 years of Spanish presence in these parts of the world, the laws were compiled several times, most notably in 1680 under Charles II in the Recopilación de las Leyes de los Reynos de las Indias (Compilation of the Laws of the Kingdoms of the Indies). This became considered the classic collection of the laws, although later laws superseded parts of it, and other compilations were issued.

== History ==
The Spanish Viceroyalties in the Americas generated conflict between indigenous peoples ('Natives' or 'Indians') and the Spanish colonists. The Spanish attempted to control the Natives to force their labor. At the same time, conflicts on policy and implementation occurred between the encomenderos and the Crown.

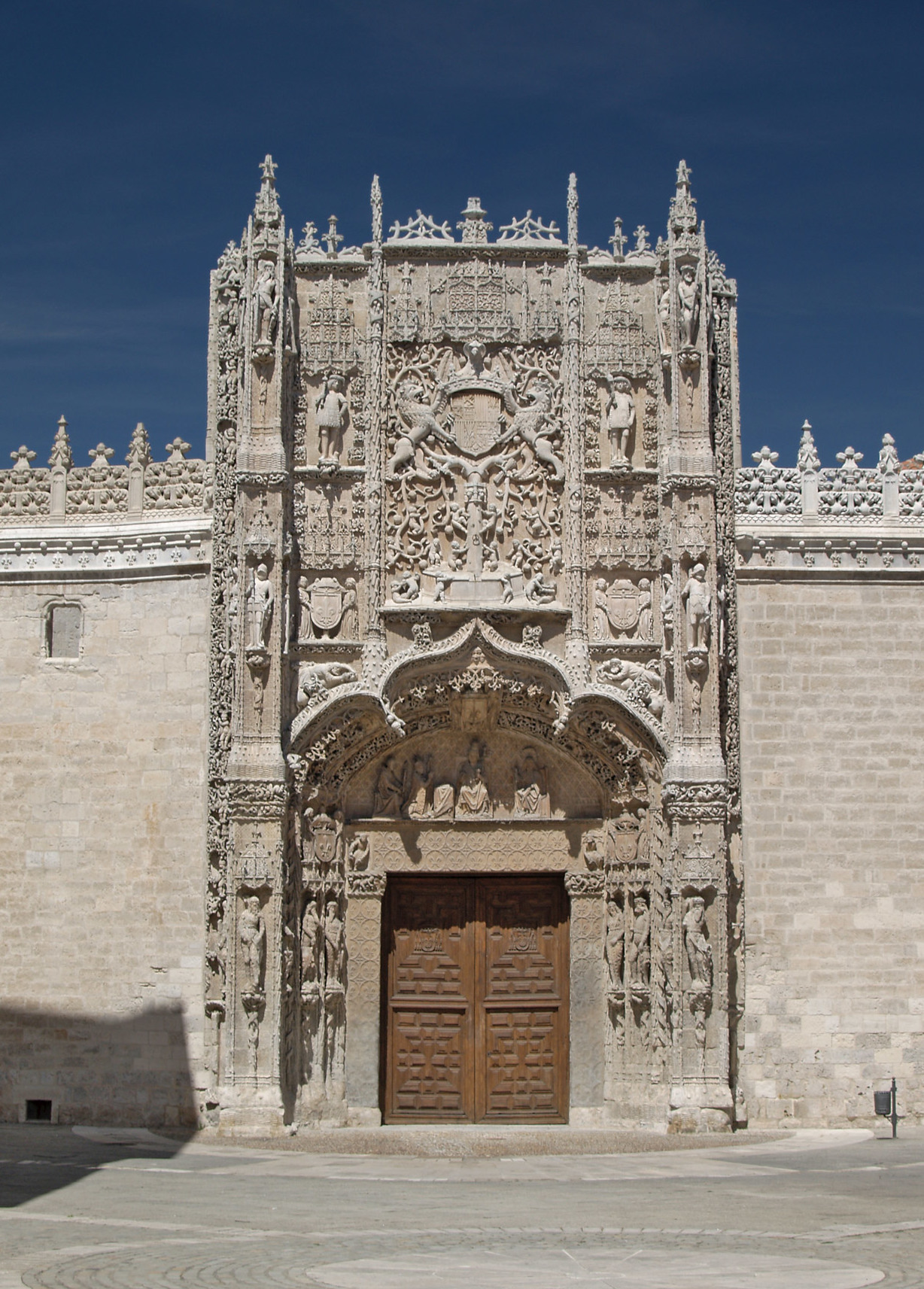
Colegio de San Gregorio, Valladolid

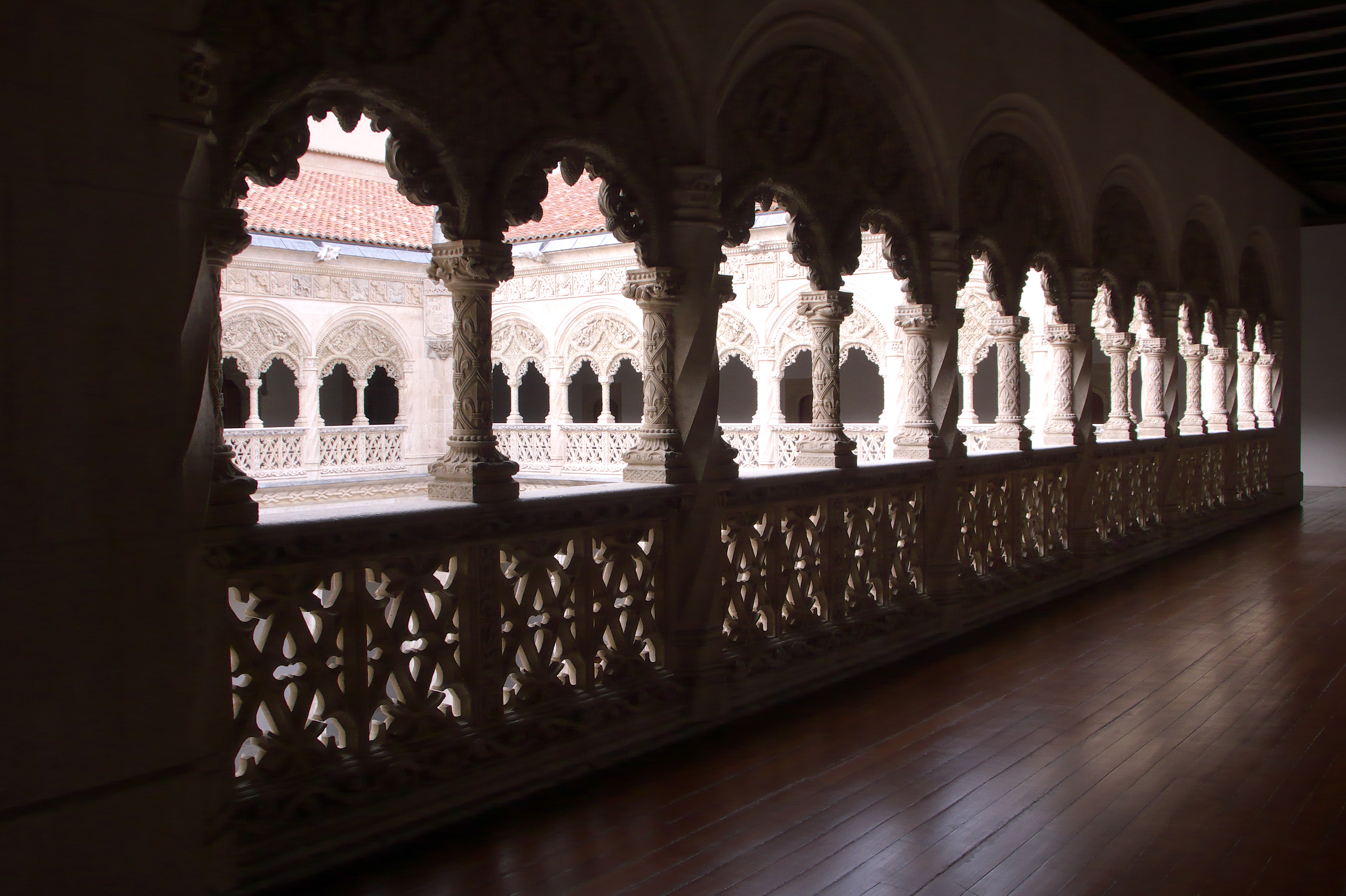
Colegio de San Gregorio, where the Laws of the Indies were born

Two of the main sets of laws issued in the 16th century regulated Spanish interaction with the Native peoples, an issue about which the Crown quickly became concerned soon after the voyages of Christopher Columbus and his governorship. The Laws of Burgos (1512), signed by King Ferdinand II of Aragon, focused upon the welfare of the conquered native peoples. The issue was revisited after Bartolomé de las Casas brought attention to abuses being carried out by encomenderos. The Laws of Burgos were revised by the New Laws of 1542 issued by Carlos I and quickly revised again in 1552, after the laws met resistance from colonists. These were followed by the Ordinances Concerning Discoveries in 1573, which forbade any unauthorized operations against independent Native Americans.

The Valladolid debate (1550–1551) was the first moral debate in European history to discuss the rights and treatment of a colonized people by colonizers. Held in the Colegio de San Gregorio, in the Spanish city of Valladolid, it was a moral and theological debate about the colonization of the Americas, its justification for the conversion to Catholicism and more specifically about the relations between the European settlers and the natives of the New World. It consisted of a number of opposing views about the way natives were to be integrated into colonial life, their conversion to Christianity and their rights and obligations. According to the French historian Jean Dumont, the Valladolid debate was a major turning point in world history, saying "In that moment in Spain appeared the dawn of the human rights".

To guide and regularize the establishment of presidios (military towns), missions, and pueblos (civilian towns), King Phillip II developed the first version of the Laws of the Indies. This comprehensive guide was composed of 148 ordinances to aid colonists in locating, building, and populating settlements. These ordinances would be used throughout what is now called South America, Central America, Mexico, the US American West, and the Spanish East Indies. They codified the city planning process and represented some of the first attempts at a general plan. Signed in 1573, the Laws of the Indies are considered the first wide-ranging guidelines towards design and development of communities. These laws were heavily influenced by Vitruvius' Ten Books of Architecture and Leon Battista Alberti's treatises on the subject.

== Effects on town planning ==
In Book IV of the 1680 compilation of the Laws of the Indies, plans were set forth in detail on every facet of creating a community, including town planning. Examples of the range of rules include:

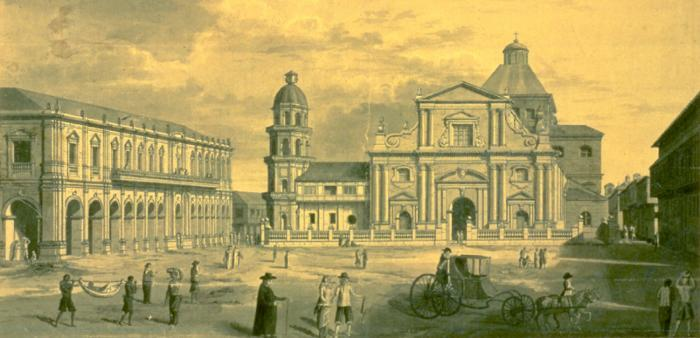
The plaza, or city square, of Manila, Philippines

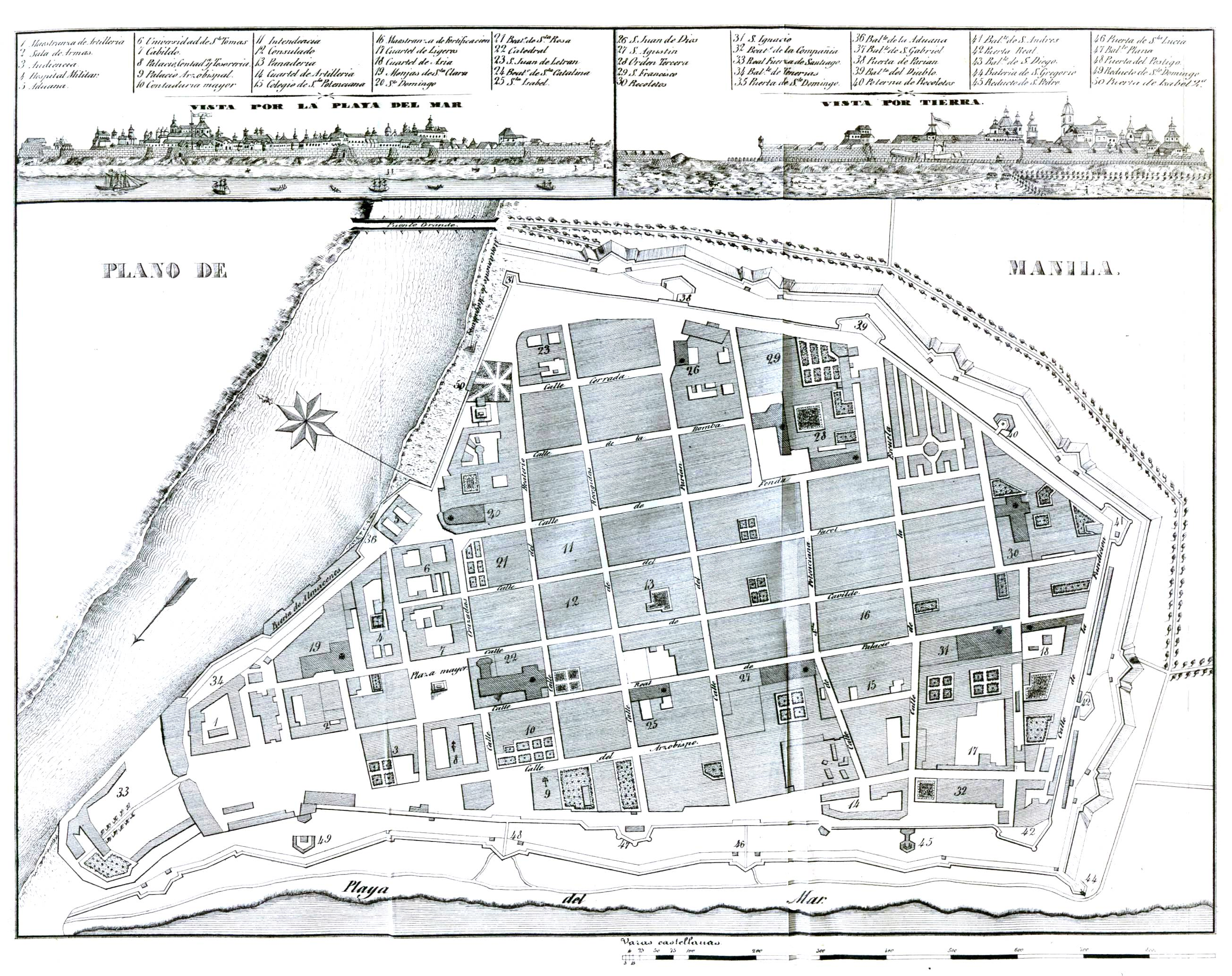
Plan of the walled city of Manila with elements of colonial planning present

- Those [Colonists] who should want to make a commitment to building a new settlement in the form and manner already prescribed, be it of more or less than 30 vecinos (freemen), (know that) it should be of no less than twelve persons and be awarded the authorization and territory in accordance with the prescribed conditions.
- Having made the selection of the site where the town is to be built, it must, as already stated, be in an elevated and healthy location; [be] with means of fortification; [have] fertile soil and with plenty of land for farming and pasturage; have fuel, timber, and resources; [have] fresh water, a native population, ease of transport, access and exit; [and be] open to the north wind; and, if on the coast, due consideration should be paid to the quality of the harbor and that the sea does not lie to the south or west; and if possible not near lagoons or marshes in which poisonous animals and polluted air and water breed.
- They [Colonists] shall try as far as possible to have the buildings all of one type for the sake of the beauty of the town.
- Within the town, a commons shall be delimited, large enough that although the population may experience a rapid expansion, there will always be sufficient space where the people may go to for recreation and take their cattle to pasture without them making any damage.
- The site and building lots for slaughterhouses, fisheries, tanneries, and other business which produce filth shall be so placed that the filth can easily be disposed of.

These rules are part of a body of 148 regulations configuring any settlement according to the rule of Spain and its colonies. This continued as a precedent in all towns under Spanish control until the relinquishing of the land to others, as in the case of the American colonies and their growth. The Laws of the Indies are still used as an example to design guidelines for communities today.

The Laws specify many details of towns. A plan is made centered on a Plaza Mayor (main square) of size within specified limits, from which twelve straight streets are built in a rectilinear grid. The directions of the streets are chosen according to the prevailing winds, to protect the Plaza Mayor. The guidelines recommend a hospital for non-contagious cases near the church, and one for contagious diseases further away.

Most townships founded in any part of the Spanish Empire in America before the various parts became independent countries were planned according to the Laws. These include many townships with Spanish names located in what is now the United States. The creation of a central square and rectilinear grid of streets was different from the haphazard and organic growth that led to meandering streets in many old townships in Iberia.

== Laws in the Viceroyalty of New Spain ==
In the Viceroyalty of New Spain, specific laws were applied to regulate life and labor.

Regarding labor, provisions were enacted that aimed to benefit the indigenous people, called naturales at that time. The economic interests of the upper classes were affected if these provisions were fully enforced.

The following points were to be applied:

- Protection of minors, Law 3, Title 13, Book VI
- Regulation of the workday to 8 hours daily, making Spain the first country in the world to implement the 8-hour workday, surpassing England by more than 200 years, Law 13, Title 13, Book VI
- Humane and fair treatment in labor relations between workers and employers, Law 13, Title 5, Book VI
- Obligation to make payments promptly every week, in money and not in goods, Law 12, Title 15, Book VI
- Freedom of work

Additionally, certain regional rights similar to those possessed by Spaniards in Europe were developed (and had not yet been generalized in the peninsula), such as the Ordinance of Intendants of 1786, which granted the indigenous people the right to choose their own authorities annually (in the main towns).

Moreover, the indigenous people had the power to write to the King of Spain in their native languages (predominantly Nahuatl as the lingua franca, but also Mixtec, Zapotec, etc.) with requests to maintain their lands, their status, and even a perpetual salary (especially for those descended from indigenous auxiliaries of the conquest). The indigenous nobility received advice and managed to be treated as another noble class within the Kingdom of Castile, requesting from Spanish imperial officials what symbols should appear on their family crests, according to their own indigenous tradition. By law, the use of native languages was tolerated and even promoted in the dynamics of colonial society. The Spanish, in turn, had to rely on indigenous specialists for certain infrastructure projects, and they were legally obliged to carry out public service works for the indigenous communities (such as the Acueduct of Padre Tembleque to transport water to the town of Otumba), in the same way that it was done for European subjects.

That ennoblement of the indigenous people and the recognition of local aristocracies symbolized the foundations of the Indias law in a social pact between the indigenous chiefs and the Catholic Monarchs for the development of a social order favorable to indigenous subjects through the protection of the Spanish monarch.

As the territorial organization of New Spain developed, the laws established that, as long as the indigenous people were up to date with their legal documents, they could be exempted from paying the indigenous tribute or request land grants. Moreover, the indigenous people were recognized as holding the title to their lands, being protected against attempts of usurpation by some Spaniards, which led to several disputes. Through their authorities (mayors and chiefs), they would file their claims and complaints to the authorities of the Royal Audiencia. Additionally, the viceregal authorities were always required to conduct an investigation before granting any property to determine if the requested lands would harm the local residents.

On the other hand, a health policy for the indigenous people was developed, with ordinances and royal decrees issued to establish hospital institutions specifically to address the physical needs of the indigenous population. Notable among these was the Royal Hospital of Indigenous People in Mexico, which also contributed to the evangelization of the indigenous people and the restructuring of their communities, as well as combating the epidemics brought by European diseases. These hospitals were usually administered by the Dominicans, Augustinians, and Franciscans.

Although there was an attempt to drastically increase the indigenous tribute, the Superior Board of the Royal Treasury of New Spain declared that it could not have been the king's intention to condemn the indigenous people to an unfortunate situation, "but rather to demand from them only the tribute their strength could bear, with the gentleness and kindness so recommended by the laws." Thus, reductions in the fiscal burden were made for the "Republic of Indians" (Spanish: República de Indios), arguing that there would be serious consequences from increasing taxes without simultaneously raising the wages of the indigenous people. The process for determining the tributes to be paid by the indigenous people, in a fair amount, was carried out in three ways: A "visit," an assessment of the economic capabilities of the indigenous people; a "count," a determination of the indigenous population; and a "valuation," which aimed to set the type and amount of taxes.

== Laws in the Viceroyalty of Peru ==
In terms of guarantees for social conditions of dignified life, the Peruvian viceroys, after receiving reports of mistreatment and exploitation of the workers of the Indian Political Society, made multiple efforts to abide by compliance with Indian laws and respect for the natural law of the Indian. and mestizo as a human person:

I have been informed that the Indians who serve in the mills are owed a large sum of pesos for their wages and are paid with papers and other things in such a way that many die without receiving what is owed to them and to see that they come

— Marquis of Guadalcazar, 1622

- In 1664, Viceroy Diego de Benavides consolidated in the Viceroyalty of Peru the public work schedule (9-10 hours), the minimum wage, and exceptions to work based on sex, age, and residence. Likewise, he ordered the closure and destruction of numerous informal mills where indigenous people were exploited for more than 14 hours and where even children were forced to work.
- In the years 1668-1670, Viceroy Pedro Fernández de Castro restructured the labor system of the Indians in the mines, haciendas and obrajes, to prevent them from being exploited and abused. He also forbids "the owners of plantations, mills, mines and factories" from forcing orphaned children to work against their will.
- In 1680, Viceroy Melchor de Liñan ordered that employers (miners, encomenderos, landowners, ranchers and workers) must issue employment contracts for all their workers. The governor also establishes that the "miserable Indians", who are not subject to the mitas, have the freedom to change jobs, if their emperor does not comply with paying their salary or requires additional work hours that have not been fixed in their contract. In 1681 he also ordered the destruction of various mills that did not comply with the ordinances and imprisoned many mill owners.
- In 1687, Viceroy Melchor de Navarra prohibited employers from haciendas and obrajes from paying their workers with utensils, food or any type of merchandise, establishing that they should be paid their corresponding salaries according to the rates established by the government.

== See also ==
- Laws of Burgos
- New Laws
- Derecho indiano
- Indian Reductions
- Jesuit Reductions
- Urban planning
- 1599 Philippines Referendum
