= Diego de Sandoval =

Spanish explorer and conquistador (c. 1505 – c. 1580)

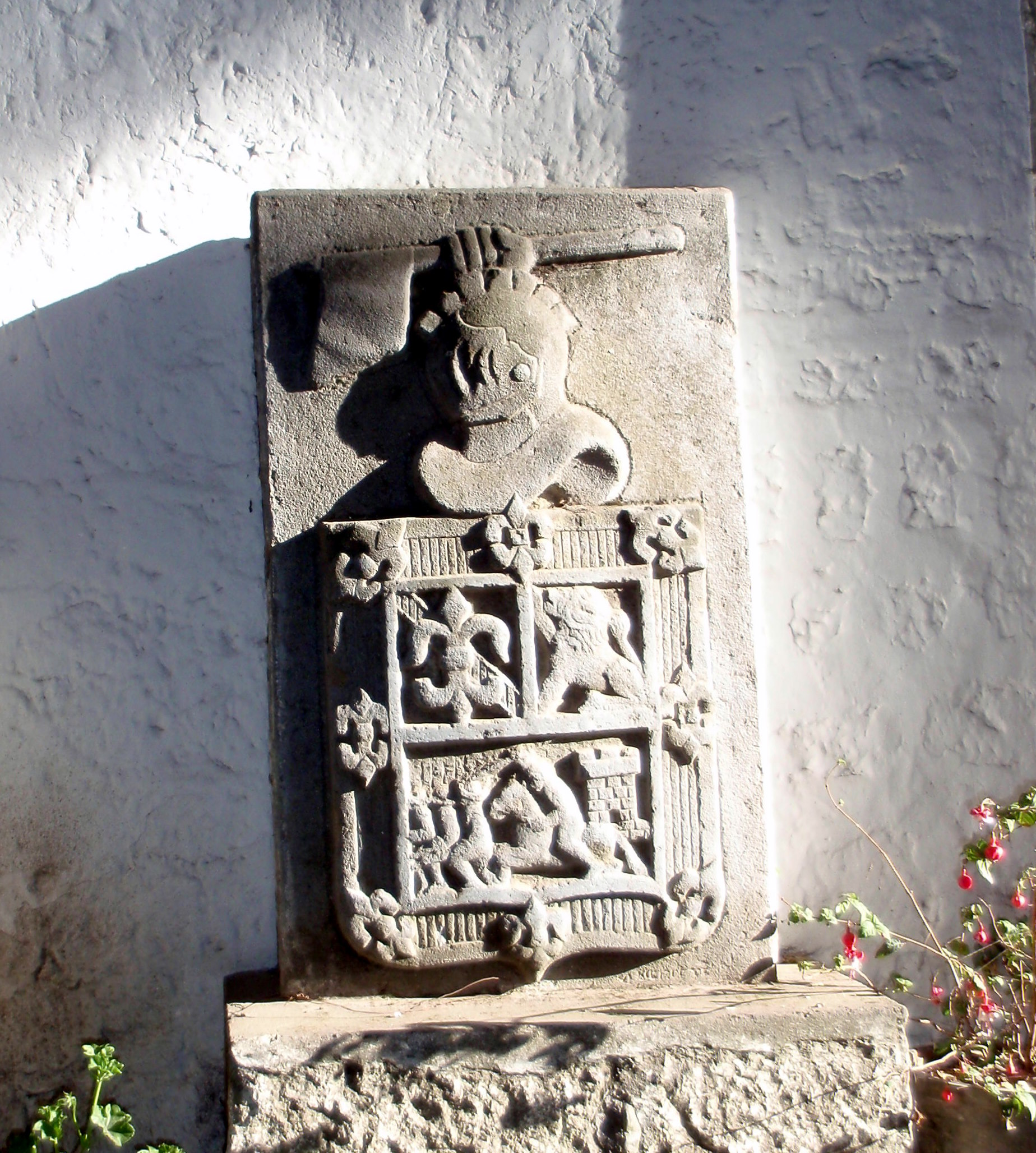
Coat of arms given to Diego de Sandoval after he helped lift the siege of Lima

Don Diego de Sandoval y la Mota (c. 1505 – c. June 1580) was a Spanish explorer and conquistador.

== Biography ==
Sandoval was born in the town of Santa Olalla, near Toledo, around 1505. His parents, Gonzalo de Sandoval and Inés de la Mota, belonged to established Toledan families.

In 1522, aged barely 17, he crossed the Atlantic to the American continent, newly encountered by Europeans. Together with Pedro de Alvarado he set out for the conquest of Guatemala, paying his own way (horse and weapons). He participated in the founding of the city of Santiago de los Caballeros, then established himself in Cuzcatán.

Around 1533 he joined Alvarado on his journey to Quito. They first arrived in the coast of what is now the Ecuadorian province of Manabi, then had to cross the dense jungle around the Guayas River to reach the lower part of the Andes range. They arrived at a pass called Liribamba, where Sandoval and his men found another conquistador, Sebastian de Benalcazar, whose forces he joined (after the two leaders arranged for monetary compensation for Alvarado). Sandoval and Benalcazar soon became friends and with their forces advanced on the forces of Rumiñahui (who took charge of the Inca forces after Atahualpa's death) in the north.

On December 6, 1534 Diego de Sandoval was one of the first "vecinos" (citizens with rights) to receive a piece of land in the newly founded San Francisco de Quito (current capital of Ecuador). The next year he went with Benalcazar to regain contact with the Spaniards that had stayed in Santiago (now Santiago de Guayaquil) and pacify the region around the Guayas river and Puna Island. They then marched on to San Miguel de Piura through the land of the Cañari (a tribe that gave fierce resistance to the Incas during their own conquest) where they met a fleeing group of daughters of Huayna Capac (the Inca ruler before Atahualpa). Sandoval got one of them from Benalcazar, after she was taken to him and had presented herself "as the daughter of the lord of Peru, Huayna Capac". She was called 'La Coya' by the first "vecinos" of Quito. He had her baptized with the name Francisca, living with her but without officially marrying her and then returning with her to Quito. According to John Hemming "Sandoval captured a group of Inca fugitives including the sister-wife of Atahualpa who was baptized as Doña Francisca Coya (1515–1544).. the natives of Quito venerated her with pathetic passion".

He was called by Francisco Pizarro to answer some unspecified accusation but at arrival found that Lima had been besieged by an Indian revolt. With his men he dislodged the surrounding forces from San Cristobal hill, thus getting Pizarro's thanks and absolution. He immediately returned to Quito looking for more men to stop the revolt in Peru, but the current leader of the city (Capt. Pedro de Puelles) opposed him in this so he had to go to the province of Cañar (that was under his command) to recruit 500 Cañari warriors. The Cañari had historically resisted the Inca invasions and having suffered greatly under their empire were eager to help the Spaniards. Sandoval and his Cañari forces marched south to engage the forces of Inca Manco who harassed the Spanish forces with his own. After a long struggle he managed to subdue the revolt and broker a peace between the factions fighting in the Mamaicanta highlands.

On 1536 'La Coya' gave birth in Quito to a daughter, baptized Eugenia de Sandoval Inca, who lived in Popayan and later in Anserma with her father after her mother's death and who received in 1545 a royal grant confirming her rights (Real Cédula de Legitimación) from Charles V, Holy Roman Emperor (Charles I of Spain) so that she could marry Captain Gil de Rengifo (leaving numerous decedents in both Ecuador and Colombia).

In 1537 he was named Alguacil Mayor (colonial office) and increased his land holdings in Mulaló, Pomasqui and other areas around Quito. In that year he also presented his title of "Alferez" that permitted him to carry the flag of the king.

In 1538 he received a confirmation of his "encomienda" of the Cañaris from Pizarro and in 1539 he further proved his services to the crown in places like Cuzco and Popayán. He lost all his commands and was taken prisoner to Lima during the uprising of Gonzalo Pizarro.

Around 1541 he found his friend Alonso de Fuenmayor in the city of Pasto and went into business raising pigs. He was very successful with this venture. He went to Cali and found buyers for a herd of sheep he had brought from the south and got enough money to convince Benalcazar to name him Governor and General Captain of Nevia and of the Pijao and Panchen Indians.

He then joined the forces of Lcdo. Vaca de Vega who had been sent by the crown to punish Almagro (the younger) and helped man his forces with people from the amazon regions.

On 1543 he presented the titles and commands that Benalcazar had given him but had to confront several local authorities in order to get them legalized. Through all these travails he kept his business sense and acquired many land holdings as payment for his support of the crown and its representatives. Around 1545 he was named Lieutenant Governor and General Captain of Anserma and helped the now Viceroy Blasco Núñez Vela in his expeditions and conquests with his own money.

This same year he married Catalina Calderón de Robles (widow of Alonso Castro and later of Triana and mother of one son), paying a handsome dowry, with whom he had two daughters and many descendants in Quito.

In 1547 he heeded Pedro de la Gasca (the new crown representative) in his call to war again the rebellious Gonzalo Pizarro from whom he was in bad terms since his imprisonment in 1540, but a rebellion began in Anserma and he could not leave his post.

In 1548 he traveled to Lima and was again given "encomiendas" in Mulalo and Pomasqui (close to Quito) and returned to Quito with his family.

Around 1550 he became the owner of the area known as Mullihambato and created ranches dedicated to raising and commercialization of sheep, goats, cattle and pigs. The Quito city government gave him a special mark to distinguish his animals and special rights for their sale in the region.

There is little information from 1550 to 1559, but in that year he returns to Quito and becomes "Regidor Perpetuo de su Cabildo" (a sort of perpetual magistrate of the city). At this time he began the construction of the chapel of San Juan de Latrán next to the church of La Merced in Quito. In 156l Pope Pius IV approved said construction. In 1562 the king, Phillip II, confirmed his appointment as Regidor Perpetuo.

Around 1565 he returned to Spain to rest from his American ordeals. He visited the town where he was born and the place where his grandfather's weapons (Hernán Dianes de San Pedro) and took some of them back to Quito where they some are still held. In 1567 king Philip II gave him his own coat of arms, in which some of his exploits, like the breaking the siege of Lima, were shown. In 1568 he returned to Quito bringing many decorations for the chapel he had built, including a couple of paintings by the Italian artist Titian and to two relics of Santa Maria de Nieva (piece of hand and foot).

1577 his encomienda of Mulalo was confirmed for two lives by the crown and on May 29, 1580 he wrote his will in Quito with the scribe Juan Carrillo. His lands in Mulalo were divided among various heirs and part of them was given to the Indians that lived there. His great wealth, that included houses, workshops, land, silver, jewels, cattle, horses went to his two daughters. His house in Quito, next to that of another conquistador Juan de Londoño, was left to his eldest daughter.

He died a few days later at the house of his son in law, Miguel Fernandez de Sandoval, and was buried in the chapel he had built for the purpose (San Juan de Letran). Due to a contract with the church of la Merced masses were to be said for him in his chapel from then on.
