= Lorena Escudero =

Ecuadorian politician

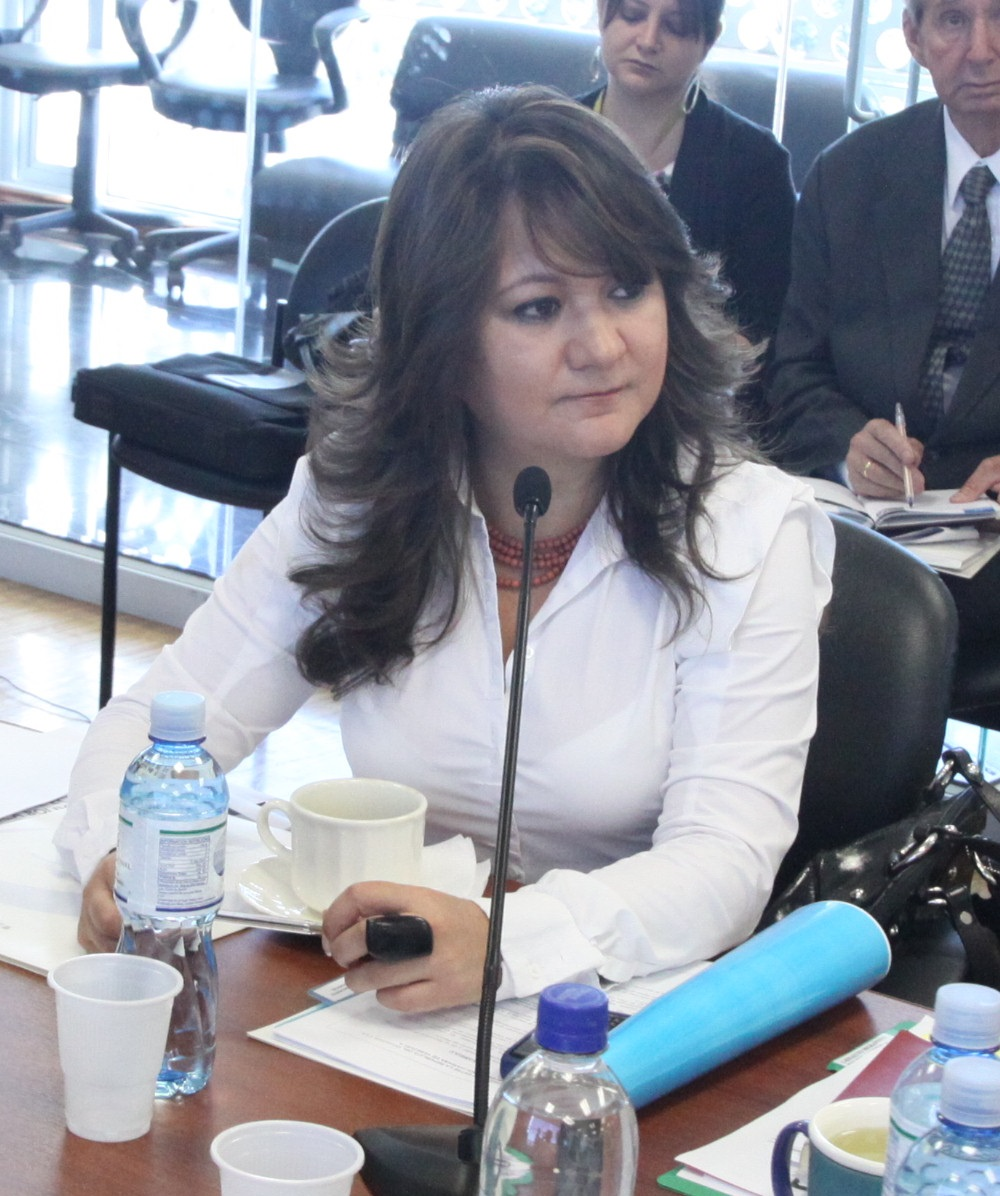
Lorena Escudero

Lorena Escudero was the Defense Minister in Ecuador, appointed by Rafael Correa to replace Guadalupe Larriva after her death. Escudero was sworn in on February 2, 2007. She was one of five female Latin American defense ministers at the time. Besides Ecuador, the other counties were Argentina, Chile, Colombia and Uruguay.

Escudero resigned August 30, 2007 due to backlash when she announced homosexuals can openly serve in the military. Wellington Sandoval replaced her.
