= Luis Sandoval =

Luis Sandoval may refer to:

- Luis Sandoval (broadcaster), Mexican actor, reporter and entertainer
- Luis Sandoval (footballer) (born 1999), Colombian footballer
- Luis Sandoval (wrestler), Panamanian wrestler
- Luis Alonso Sandoval (born 1981), Mexican footballer
- Luis Cresencio Sandoval, Mexican defense secretary
