= Mary Sandoval =

American mathematician

Mary Ruth Sandoval is an American mathematician, the Seabury Professor of Mathematics and Natural Philosophy at Trinity College (Connecticut). Her research interests include global analysis, the study of differential equations on varying topological spaces, and spectral geometry, the study of these spaces through the systems of fundamental solutions to certain differential equations.

Sandoval majored in mathematics at Yale University, graduating in 1989. She worked for the United States Department of Energy on mathematical models related to the Clean Air Act, before returning to the University of Michigan for graduate study in mathematics, earning a master's degree in 1993 and completing her Ph.D. in 1997. Her dissertation, Wave-Trace Asymptotics For Operators Of Dirac Type, was supervised by Alejandro Uribe. After postdoctoral research at Purdue University as a Project NExT Fellow, she took a visiting position at Trinity College in 1999, and remained as an assistant professor beginning in 2001. She became full professor in 2023, and was named as Seabury Professor in 2024. The Seabury Professorship, established in 1830, is the oldest endowed professorship at Trinity College.
