= Cadi Mané =

Bissau-Guinean politician

Cadi Mané is a Guinea Bissau doctor and politician who served as minister of defence from 2014 to 2015.

== Career ==
Mané is a military doctor. She was appointed as Defence Minister in the government of Prime Minister Domingos Simões Pereira on 4 July 2014. She served until August 2015, when the government was dismissed by President José Mário Vaz.
