= Shaina Sandoval =

American actress (born 1992)

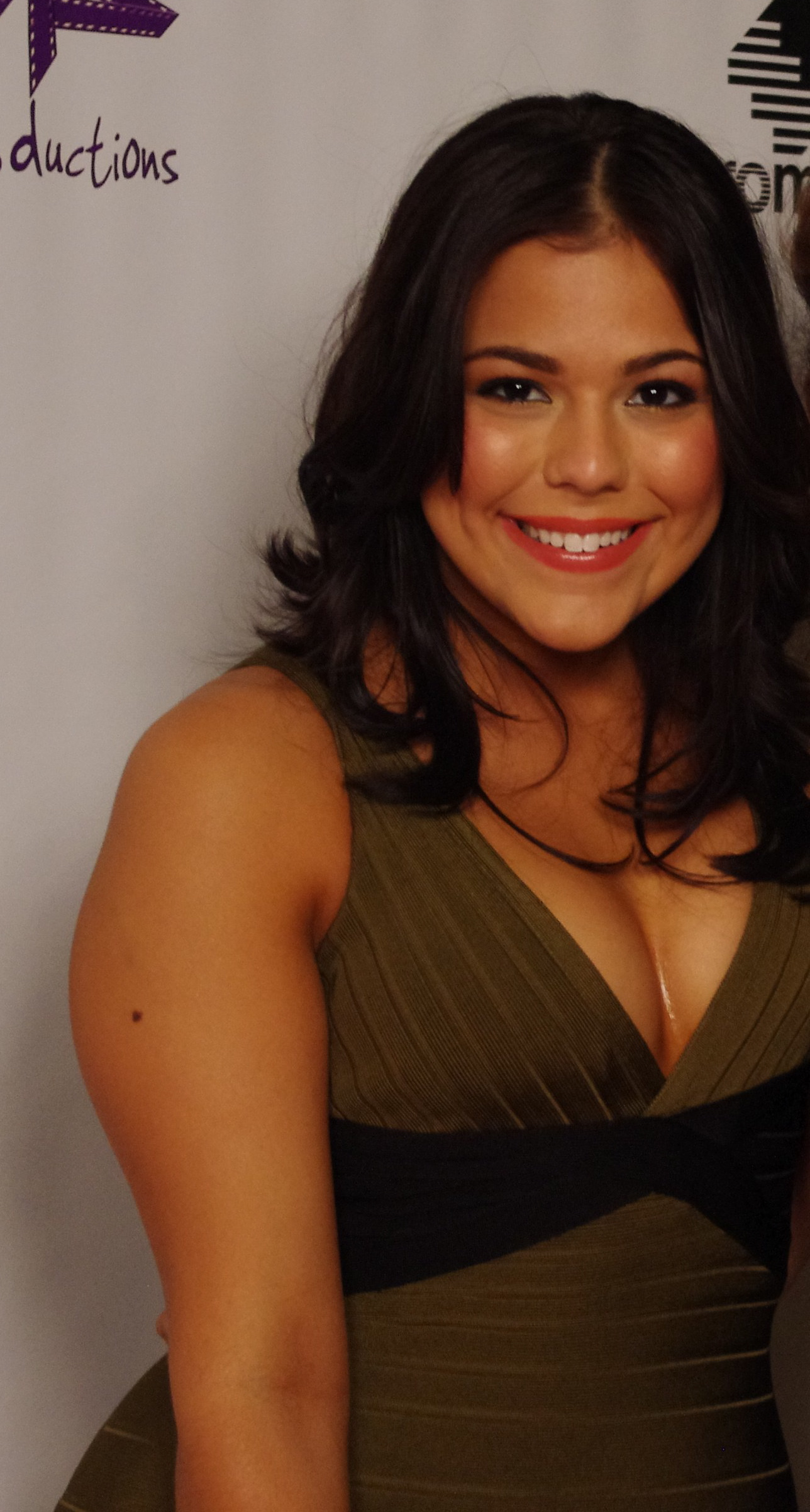
- Shaina Sandoval
- Born: January 10, 1992 (age 34); Albuquerque, New Mexico
- Occupation: Actress
- Years active: 2006–present

Shaina Sandoval (born January 10, 1992) is an American actress.

== Career ==
Shaina Sandoval was born to Samuel and Lisa Sandoval in Albuquerque, New Mexico on January 10, 1992. She moved to Dallas, Texas when she was a year old, and lived there for 15 years. She got her start in Dallas in commercial work at 13 years old.

Her first foray in film acting was in 2006 in which she had a feature role in Rain. She went on to appear in In Search of the American Dream: El Nacional, Nico-The Millionaire, and the music video Saved. She also appeared in Ungirlfriendable, and the independent film Midnight Clear, which starred Stephen Baldwin and K Callan.

Sandoval's commercial work includes spots for AT&T, Pei Wei, WalMart, Denny's, InventNow.org, and Cowboys & Indians Magazine. She is also an experienced dancer, having served as a principal with Anita N. Martinez Ballet Folklorico in Dallas, and soloing for the National Hispanic Celebration at the Majestic Theatre, as well as guest appearing in The Ancestors at the Majestic. Shaina studied with the Dance Continuum and Les Jordan at North Central Ballet in Texas, and is proficient in Ballet, Pointe, Tap, Jazz, Lyrical, and Hip-Hop.

She is currently enrolled at the Herberger Institute for the Arts at Arizona State University, and has trained with Cathryn Sullivan, Cody Linley and Mitchell Gossett at Everybody-Fits, Theresa Bell at Theresa Bell Studio, Cathryn Hartt at Hartt and Soul Studio, Suzie Torres, Q4U Productions in Texas, Amanda Melby of Verve Studios in Arizona. Shaina is also currently studying with Jean Fowler of Actor Works in Scottsdale.

She has made appearances on ABC 15 Sonoran Living in Phoenix, CBS News 11 in Dallas, Univision, Telemundo, Latino Talk TV and various radio stations throughout Texas.

== Personal life ==
Shaina has two older brothers, Josh and Jeremy. She grew up in the same town as and shared an acting coach with Selena Gomez, Jeremy Bacerra, Cody Linley, and Patrick Thomas. Shaina is also the recipient of the “Junior Female Actor” award from the MB Talent Expo in Texas. Her favorite sports include wrestling, baseball and basketball. In her spare time Shaina hikes, travels and does Bikram yoga.
