= Fernando Jurado Noboa =

Ecuadorian historian (1949)

Fernando Jurado Noboa (born 12 October 1949, Quito) is an Ecuadorian psychiatrist, historian and genealogist.

== Biography ==
=== Family situation ===
Jurado was born in Quito on 12 October 1949 in the traditional neighbourhood of San Juan. His parents were Ernesto Jurado Martínez and Inés Noboa Castillo, both from Quito, and he was baptized in the El Belén church on 21 January 1950 with the names Pablo Fernando Rodrigo. His father died when Jurado was still young. During his childhood he often travelled to Tulcán and San Juan de Pasto with his mother. It was on these journeys that he discovered his vocation for studying the societies of these cities.

Even before he was old enough to go to school he showed a talent for drawing and he would occupy himself drawing the outlines of photographs of the previous century onto cardboard. This led to his interest in reconstructing his family history and that of the rest of the country.

=== Studies and academic training ===
He spent some months at Santa Cecilia kindergarten and between 1955 and 1961 he attended Espejo Municipal School. From the age of six years he was helped by his stepfather, Augusto Paz Proaño, who was associated with the socialist party of José María Velasco Ibarra and who sparked Jurado Noboa's interest in reading historical literature at the age of seven. His family were poor throughout his school years. In 1959, at a little over 9 years old, he won his first competition for historical writing and published his first article "The imprisonment and death of Eugenio Espejo".

In 1961, he went to Sebastián de Benalcázar College and he also regularly visited the city's public libraries. He was passionate about biographies and some years later in 1964 he became interested in genealogy as a result of his innate and insatiable curiosity regarding people's fate. He won a book reading competition the same year.

Between 1964 and 1967 he became interested in public speaking and he won two intercollegiate competitions: the Human Rights Contest and the Oratory Competition organized by the Americas Project.

In 1966 he was declared Best Graduate among the biology students. At that time the Benalcázar was the best college in Quito.

In 1974 when the dictatorship was at the height of its power the military announced that the remains of Ecuador's founding fathers had been found. Jurado maintained a debate with the establishment regarding this fact through the television and press which made the authorities look ridiculous and showed that many historians said one thing in public but another in private. This possibly led to the idea of founding a group of contemporaries to carry out research. He was already using a card catalogue for arranging data and although its organization had not yet been perfected it contained around a million cards with more than 16 million pieces of data, making it the most important private archive in the country.

=== Between Medicine and History ===
Between 1967 and 1975, he studied Medicine at the Central University of Ecuador. He was a member of the School of Medicine Association.

In his second year at university he studied anatomy and during this time he completely ceased his historical research. In September 1969, the notable historian and genealogist Doctor Ezio Garay Arellano (who lived in Santiago de Guayaquil) introduced Jurado to Pedro Robles y Chambers who also lived in that city. The two developed a strong friendship and they would visit the country's regional archives whenever they were able. At this time he started his training at the Social Security Hospital that continued until his graduation. However, he never attained the same level of knowledge regarding the history and genealogy of the city of Guayaquil and its surrounding area as Garay had.

From 1969 to 1973, Jurado undertook clinical training under Doctors Asanza, Eduardo Villacís, Max Ontaneda and Hernán Proaño, who gave him a wide range of clinical experience. In 1969 he became a member of the Faculty Board and Board of Directors of Medicine.

In 1970 he started to collaborate with the magazine “Historical Museum” that was edited by Hugo Moncayo. In 1971 he published his research in the Bulletin of the National Academy of History as well as maintaining correspondence with specialists both within and outside the country. In 1970 and later in 1973, he travelled to Colombia for research purposes. He spent part of 1972 in Peru, broadening his historical and genealogical knowledge. In 1973, he was admitted to the Academy of History, at that time he was the youngest member to be given that honour.

In 1974 he was the representative for his faculty at the International Congress on Paediatrics in Quito.

In 1975 he started to revise Quito's protocol archives and he graduated in medicine with honours as second in his year group.

Between 1975 and 1976, Jurado completed his year of rural medicine in Guasuntos, in the south of Chimborazo Province. The local population contained three distinct social levels that were in constant conflict. These circumstances encouraged him to investigate the sociological basis for the formation of different classes.

After visiting France, Switzerland, Austria and Italy he travelled to Spain where he carried out research in Madrid and more particularly in Andalucía. At the end of 1976 he was admitted for a year to the University of Pamplona as a post-graduate in psychiatry, following a recommendation by Father José Reig Satorres. However, after six months he became a member of a team that went to study to the formation of the first psychiatric hospital in Spain to use English methods. Jurado redesigned the programme by shortening it and he co-authored a book on his experiences called “Psychiatric Assistance in Navarra”. That same year he carried out further research in the north of the peninsula. He was made Head of the Psychiatric Department at the Institute in 1978.

He married Elena Piqueras Esparza on 11 August of the same year with whom he had three children.

He was also a professor of pre and post graduate studies in the psychology of tourism at the Spanish Institute of Tourism. In 1979 he was Head of Psychiatry and also of Residents a second time.

== Genealogy ==
=== CENIGA ===
Jurado founded the National Centre for Genealogical and Anthropological Studies (Centro Nacional de Investigaciones Genealógicas y Antropológicas, CENIGA) in 1975, along with José Freile Larrea and his sons Juan and Carlos Freile Granizo.

He was named as Director of CENIGA and produced the first three journals published by the society. Along with the guayaquileño traditionalist Rodolfo Pérez Pimentel Jurado organised the First Ecuadorian Genealogy Conference, which unfortunately was a failure.

=== Return to Ecuador ===
Spain offered Jurado a promising future but his Ecuadorian roots meant that he missed his home country. In the last year of his residency he spent many hours in the public library making a thorough examination of the 88 volumes of the genealogy encyclopedia produced by Arturo García Carrafa. His experiences during his time in Spain had made him less Hispanophile than he had been on his arrival. His training is the social sciences had given him a new way of seeing things and he started to slowly develop a more mestizo conception of culture in South America.

He arrived back in Ecuador in September 1979 with the intention of revolutionizing psychiatry, which he considered to be the most backward of the specialist medical disciplines in his country. However, he did not ingratiate himself with his peers and in January 1980 he went into practice by himself in Ambato. He also started to contribute medical and historical articles to the local newspaper El Heraldo.

In March of that year he gained the position of Psychiatric Researcher for the Institute of Criminology in Quito. In addition he wrote a column on mental health for newspapers in Ambato and for the magazine Desde el Surco. In the latter part of 1980 he reorganized and updated diagnostic procedures and methods of treatment at the Hospital Julio Endara to improve their scientific quality and efficacy.

From September 1980 until the end of 1982 he had a punishing work schedule in trying to balance his professional and intellectual interests. He would start work at 7am at the National Historical Archives where he collaborated on research work with Alfredo Costales on indigenous peoples, he also lectured at Marianas College. From 11am until 1pm he taught at La Inmaculada. From 2pm until 4pm he worked as a criminologist. He returned to the National Archive between 4pm and 6pm. He then gave private consultations between 6pm and 9pm. In addition, on two days of the week he taught psychopathology at the Central University.

In 1981 Jurado, with the help of some of his students, carried out the first investigations into the consumption of marihuana in Quito and weekend binge drinking.

=== Friends of Genealogy Society ===
By 1982 he came to understand that not all genealogists could work together and that ideological differences within an organization can prove a distraction. Therefore, in January 1983 he resigned from CENIGA to found the Friends of Genealogy Society with Costales and Enrique Muñoz Larrea. Ecuadorian genealogy was therefore split into two areas, an obsolete, elitist, traditionalist side and a progressive, social side.

In 1983, Jurado published three magazines with the new society, which proved to be such a success that three editions had to be published of each one. The families studied were of little interest to professional genealogists but they were popular with the magazine-buying public. Jurado published his classic work Las coyas y pallas del Tahuantinsuyo. The initial print run of five thousand copies sold out straight away. Oswaldo Viteri helped with the artistic and philosophical conception of racial mixing and Xerox of Ecuador published a number of editions.

That same year the town of Ambato designated Jurado as its Official Chronicler. In addition the local press published three of his books: "Themes in the History of Ambato" (Temas de la historia de Ambato), "Ambatonian Chronicles" (Crónicas de la ambateñía) and "Biographic Dictionary of the Tungurahua" (Diccionario biográfico del Tungurahua), of which only the first 50 pages were ever published. He resigned from the post of Official Chronicler after two years, as he did not want to depend on the local authorities. His reasoning was that he would be “less enlightened but more pedantic”. However, as the post is for life he retains the title.

By the end of 1983 he no longer worked in Ambato. From July of that year he published the SAG Collection with Servimpress up until 1992.

The success of this collection gave him the idea of increasing it to fifty volumes. He has currently exceeded this number making it the country's largest, most important and most successful cultural collection.

Jurado was accepted into the Medicinal History Academy in 1984 for his study entitled "Doctors and Medicine during Independence" ("Los Médicos y la Medicina durante la independencia"). He was also a member of the organizing committee of the International Criminology Congress that took place in Quito. He also published a study entitled "The descendants of Benalcázar in Ecuadorian social formation" ("Los descendientes de Benalcázar en la formación social ecuatoriana") in eight volumes. That same year he made contact with Colombian historians to discuss genealogy. This collaboration gave rise to the formation of CEGAS in San Juan de Pasto in 1985 and to the First International Genealogy Congress at the end of that year.

Jurado formed the Guayas branch of SAG in 1985 with the help of Ezio Garay. Many Ecuadorian genealogists, and those from abroad as well, started to value data found in Census, Church records (capellanías and dispensas), anecdotes and family traditions which are all elements that Jurado has promoted through he work and throughout his many years of experience. This same year he returned to Spain for a meeting of psychiatrists who trained at Navarra University. He also undertook research in Spain and Portugal.

In 1986 he organized the 3rd International Genealogy Congress that took place in Quito with representatives from five countries.

To date he has more than 300 published titles both in the areas of history and medicine. He collaborates with the “Guayaquil University Magazine”, Pregón which is published in Medillín, the “Bulletin of the National Academy of History”, Friends of Genealogy Society Magazine”, SAG, and “Medical Updates” and he is a member of its assessment committee. He also publishes articles in “Messenger”, the "Institute of Criminology Magazine”, the “Diners Information Bulletin” and the “Culture Magazine” which is published by the Central Bank.

Along with Hernán Rodríguez Castelo he is considered to be one of the foremost Ecuadorian researchers of all time.

== Jurado’s polemic ==
From the start Jurado's work has represented a breakthrough in the dissemination of historical information in Ecuador. He has always tried to avoid prejudices that do not fit with the facts. He gives genealogy a general focus that is accessible to all social classes.

All his works reflect the multi-ethnic origins of all Ecuadorians. The contributions of Indians, Africans, Arabs and Jews in Europe and Spain are a common factor in his books, articles and lectures. A number of his books chart the rise and fall of various Ecuadorian families as social mobility is a constant in the social dynamic throughout history.

== Published works ==
Fernando Jurado Noboa has been one of the most prolific historic researchers in Ecuador and he has published a large number of works. The following is an incomplete list of his works.

=== Books ===
- Las Coyas y Pallas del Tahuantinsuyo, 1983.
- Los Argüello en el Ecuador. 450 años de historia, 1984.
- Los Porras y los Garcés en el Ecuador, 1984.
- Los Cornejo en la historia política del Ecuador, 1985.
- Los descendientes de Benalcázar en la formación social ecuatoriana, ocho tomos, 1985–1990.
- Los Noboa de la Sierra, 1985.
- Los Vásconez en el Ecuador, 1986.
- Los Larrea: burocracia, tenencia de la tierra, poder político, crisis, retorno al poder y papel en la cultura, 1986.
- Los Ribadeneira antes y después de Colón, tres tomos, 1987.
- Plazas y plazuelas de Quito, Banco Central del Ecuador, 1989, ISBN 9978-72-128-2.
- Calles de Quito, Banco Central del Ecuador, 1989, ISBN 9978-72-127-4.
- Un vasco-aragonés y su descendencia en el Ecuadror: Los Chiriboga, 1989.
- La migración internacional a Quito entre 1534 y 1934, 1989.
- ¿De dónde venimos los quiteños?, 1990.
- Esclavitud en la costa pacífica, 1990.
- Sancho Hacho. Orígenes de la formación mestiza ecuatoriana, 1990.
- El chulla quiteño, 1991.
- Contribución de la SAG a la cultura ecuatoriana, compilador, 1991.
- Los Mancheno en el Ecuador. 270 años de historia, 1992.
- Los secretos del poder socio-económico: el caso Dávalos.
- Casa del Quito viejo, 1992.
- Los Donoso en el Ecuador. 1660-1992, 1993.
- Las noches de los libertadores, dos tomos, ediciones Iadap, 1993, ISBN 9978-60-007-8.
- Los españoles que vinieron, 1993.
- El proceso de blanqueamiento en el Ecuador. De los Puento a los Egas, 1992.
- Historia social de Esmeraldas. Indios, negros, mulatos, españoles y zambos del siglo XVI al XX, volumen 1, 1995.
- Las mujeres que Montalvo amó, 1995.
- Las quiteñas, Dinediciones, 1995, ISBN 9978-954-14-7.
- Los pendejos en Quito y sus alrededores, 1534-1980, 1996.
- Los Corral en el Ecuador, 1996.
- Quito: una ciudad de casta taurina, 1996.
- La Ronda: nido de cantores y poetas, Libresa ediciones, 1996, ISBN 9978-80-365-3.
- Historia social de la provincia de Bolívar, cuatro tomos, 1996–2001.
- Las Peñas: historia de una identidad casi perdida, 1997.
- Un soldado de Bolívar en Ambato (Los Holguín), 1998.
- Quito secreto, 1999.
- Alfaro y su tiempo, 1999.
- Las gentes del corregimiento: lo rural, 2001.
- Los Paz en el Ecuador y en el sur de Colombia, 2001.
- La familia Villagómez, 2002.
- Los Albornoz, 2002.
- Diccionario histórico genealógico de apellidos y familias de origen quechua, aymara y araucano (Ecuador), edición Temístocles Hernández, Quito, junio 2002, ISBN 9978-42-407-5.
- Los Veintimilla en la Sierra centro norte del Ecuador y en Lima, 2003.
- El Quito que se fue. 1850-1912, coautor, 2004, ISBN 9978-43-349-X.
- Calles, casas y gente del Centro Histórico de Quito. Protagonistas y calles en sentido oriente-occidente. De 1534 a 1950, de la calle Egas a la calle Chile, tomo I, Fonsal, 2004.
- Habemus Páez. Otra familia fundadora del Ecuador. 1546-2005, 2005.
- Riobamba: Una ciudad de andaluces en América, 2005, ISBN 978-9978-44-579-2.
- Calles, casas y gente del Centro Histórico de Quito. Protagonistas y calles en sentido oriente-occidente. De 1534 a 1950, de la calle Espejo a la calle Bolívar, tomo II, Fonsal, 2006.
- Calles, casas y gente del Centro Histórico de Quito. Protagonistas y calles en sentido oriente-occidente. De 1534 a 1950, de la calle Rocafuerte a la calle Portilla, tomo III, Fonsal, 2006.
- Rincones que cantan. Una geografía musical de Quito, Fonsal, 2006.
- Los nudos del poder. Estudio histórico sobre las familias Villavicencio y Chiriboga en el Ecuador y sus imbricaciones con el poder político, económico, social y cultural, 2007.
- Calles, casas y gente del Centro Histórico de Quito. Protagonistas de la Plaza Mayor y la Calle de las Siete Cruces, 1534-1950, tomo IV, Fonsal, 2008.
- Calles, casas y gente del Centro Histórico de Quito. Protagonistas y calles en sentido sur-norte, de 1534 a 1950, de la calle Quiroga a la calle Cuenca, tomo V, Fonsal, 2008. ISBN 978-9978-366-09-7.
- Calles, casas y gente del Centro Histórico de Quito. Protagonistas y calles en sentido occidente-oriente, de 1534 a 1950. Calles Benalcázar, Venezuela y Vargas, tomo VI, Fonsal, 2009. ISBN 978-9978-366-10-3.

=== Articles ===
- "Ascendientes del Dr. Joaquín Suárez de Villacreses", 1980.
- "Los Alfaro en el Ecuador y España", en Sociedad Amigos de la Genealogía, vol. 1, págs. 43–113, 18 ilustraciones y cuatro apéndices, 1983.
- "La historia anecdótica y la genealogía: homenaje a doña Blanca Martínez de Tinajero", en Sociedad Amigos de la Genealogía, vol. 1, pág. 124, 1983.
- "Homenaje a Atahualpa en los 450 años de su muerte", presentación de Sociedad Amigos de la Genealogía, vol. 2, págs. 3 y 4, 1983.
- "Un pariente desconocido de Santa Teresa en América", primera parte, en Sociedad Amigos de la Genealogía, vol. 2, págs. 115–234, seis gráficos y dos tablas genealógicas, 1983.
- "Homenaje a don Carlos Jaramillo Vintimilla", en Sociedad Amigos de la Genealogía, vol. 5, págs. 5–11, 1984.

== Sources ==
- Boletín de la Academia Nacional de Historia, vol. LVI, nro. 121, enero-julio de 1973, Editorial Ecuatoriana, Quito, 1973. Sin ISBN.
- Revista del Centro Nacional de Investigaciones Genealógicas y Antropológicas, Quito, julio de 1981. Sin ISBN.
- Rodolfo Pérez Pimentel, Diccionario biográfico del Ecuador, tomo V, Quito, 1987. Sin ISBN.
- José Freile Larrea, Los Freile en el Ecuador, Abya-Yala, Quito, marzo de 1994. ISBN 9978-82-491-X.
- Norma Domínguez Pérez, "El fundador de la SAG se confiesa antes los socios de la corporación", en En busca de las raíces, Quito, 2002. Sin ISBN.
- Boletín de la Academia Nacional de Historia, vol. LXXX, nros. 169–170, Producción Gráfica, Quito, 2002. Sin ISBN.
- Patricio Muñoz Valdivieso, El sevillano Agustín de Carrión y Merodio, Quito, octubre de 2007. Sin ISBN.
- Marcia Stacey Chiriboga, La polémica sangre de los Riofrío, Quito, 2007. Sin ISBN.
