= 1599 Philippines sovereignty referendums =

Vote confirming Spanish sovereignty

The Philippines referendum was a 1599 incomplete referendum ordered by King Philip II of Spain to apply in the Captaincy General of the Philippines. Issued through a real cédula on February 8, 1597, it was meant to confirm Spanish sovereignty over the Philippines by offering the native population an elective chance to cease being part of the Hispanic Monarchy. Existent results were affirmative.

The real cédula reached Manila on August 5, 1598, instructing Governor Francisco de Tello de Guzmán to organize the plebiscite among all indigenous under Spanish rule, asking them whether continue acknowledging the Spanish Empire as their legitimate authority. It was the result of many reforms within the empire to eliminate native abuse, following the premises of Francisco de Vitoria and Alonso de la Vera Cruz which postulated natives were sovereign of their own land regardless of their level of culture.

== Results ==
Tello de Guzmán informed the monarch about the result in a letter sent in July 1599. It was never answered due to the king's death the same year, which put an end to referendum. Although the counting was incomplete, the existent results were predominantly positive.

"This is what has been done from then, on virtue of your decision. Instructions have been issued in plenty to the alcaldes and churchmen in all the provinces, so through the gracious methods chosen by Your Majesty, the submission will be delivered to you. In the province of Ylocos, in the diocese of the Bishop of Nueva Segovia, this was very well applied, and submission was given to Your Majesty. Similarly, all the district of Manila, under a mission of the Augustine fathers, has given submission. La Laguna, under Franciscan fathers, has not pledged so easily, as the natives have requested one year to answer; and so I have left La Laguna, until I must inform Your Majesty, as you ordered me. The same will be done in the other provinces that ask for delay. To date I have not been informed about what has been decided."
