= Francisco de Sandoval Acacitzin =

Mexican politician

Don Francisco de Sandoval Acacitzin

Tlatoani of Itzcahuacan
- In office 1521–1554
- Appointed by: Hernán Cortés
- Preceded by: Itzcahuatzin

Personal details
- Died: 1554

Don Francisco de Sandoval Acacitzin tlatquic teuctli was the tlatoani (ruler) of the altepetl of Itzcahuacan, Tlalmanalco, Chalco, from 1521 until his death in 1554. Between 1540 and 1542, he fought under the Spanish viceroy Antonio de Mendoza in the Mixtón War and left an account in Nahuatl of his experiences in the war.
