= Guadalupe Larriva =

Ecuadorian politician (1956–2007)

Guadalupe Larriva (28 July 1956 – 24 January 2007) was an Ecuadorian politician.

== Biography ==
Larriva was born in Cuenca, the eldest daughter of Deifilio Larriva Polo and Teresita Gonzalez Harris. She was married to Rodrigo Avila. She held a Doctor of Philosophy in Geography from the University of Cuenca. She was the head of the Ecuadorian Socialist Party-Broad Front, as well as the country's defense minister under President Rafael Correa. A former university professor, she was also the first civilian in 25 years, and the first female in Ecuador's history to hold the post.

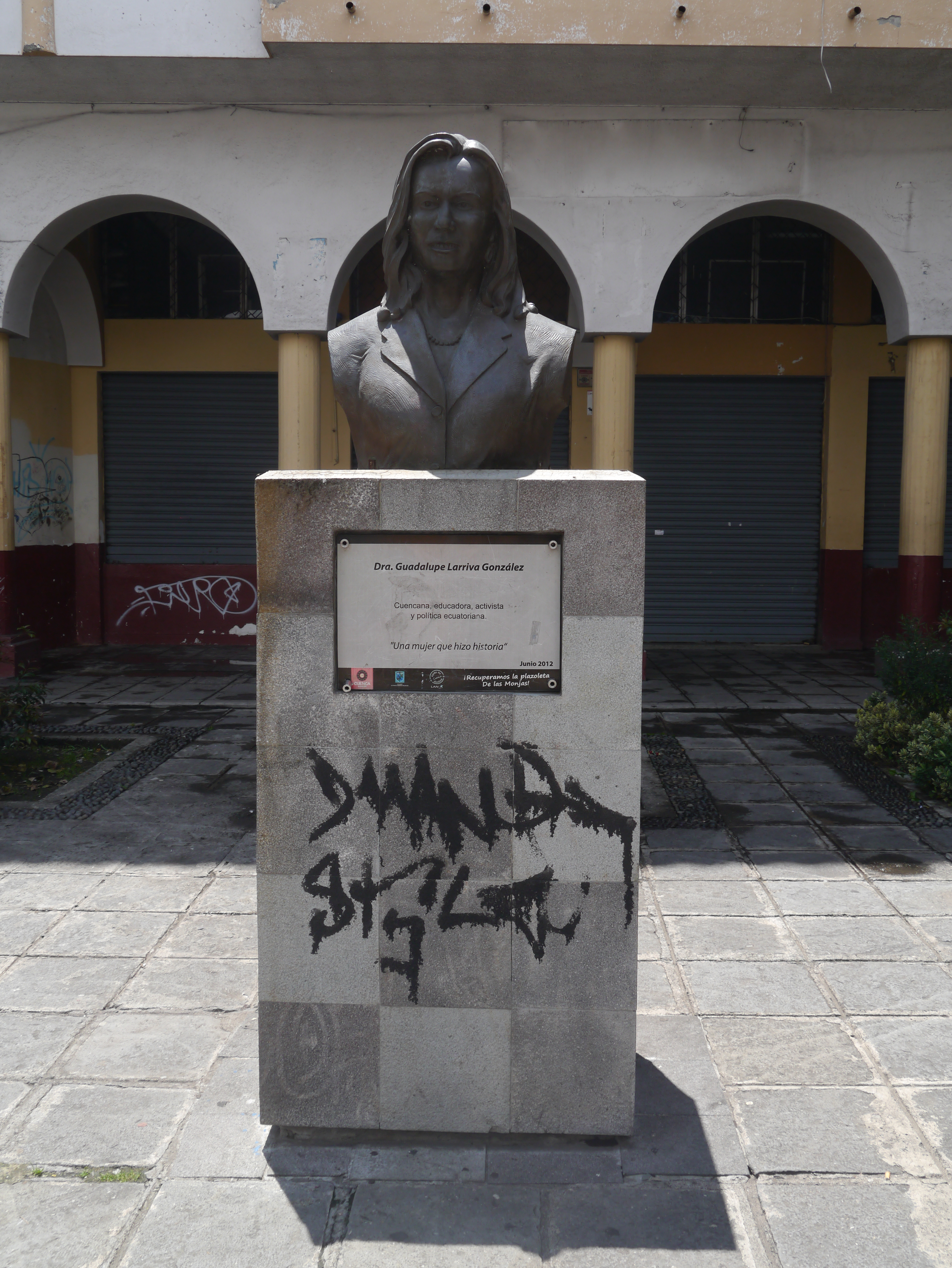

Larriva died near Manta Air Base in a helicopter crash on 24 January 2007 20:23h Ecuadorian time, when 2 Aérospatiale Gazelle helicopters of the "Aviación del Ejército Nº 43" collided during a night training. She died only nine days after being handed her portfolio as defense minister. Two days earlier the defense minister had announced that Ecuador would not renew its contract with the United States Armed Forces which allows US troops to be stationed in and operate from Manta Air Base.

All on board the 2 helicopters, including Larriva's 17-year-old daughter Claudia Ávila and 5 Army officers (Tnte. Crnel. Marco Gortaire Padovani, Cap. Celso Hugo Acosta, Cap. Byron Iván Zurita Basantes, Cap. Richard Marcelo Jurado Gallardo, Tnte. Luis Milton Herrera Espín) died in the crash.

After the death of Larriva, Rafael Correa promised to appoint another woman to the position of Defense Minister. He fulfilled that promise on 30 January 2007 when he appointed Lorena Escudero to replace her. Escudero is also from Cuenca and was also a university professor.
