= Senator Sandoval =

Senator Sandoval may refer to:

- Martin Sandoval (born 1964), Illinois State Senate
- Paula Sandoval (fl. 2010s), Colorado State Senate
