= Vecino =

Term in the Spanish Empire denoting social status

'Vecino' (or vecina, female) means either "neighbour", or resident of a location in modern Spanish. Historically in the Spanish Empire it referred instead to a householder of considerable social position in a town or a city, and was similar to "freeman" or "freeholder."

== Historical use ==
In the Spanish Empire, a vecino was a person who had a house and home in a town or city and contributed to its expenses, not necessarily living nearby; or a local figure of some worth but not an aristocrat, often the encomendero holding land in the surrounding countryside with a house within a nearby city. A person with a house in a place that he (or she) contributes to can be a vecino/a without living there. In the Empire the term implied a certain social status, with a meaning similar to "freeman" or "freeholder".

In 17th century Seville, a vecino was a person who had received citizenship (naturaleza de vecindad) from the city, and had clearly defined rights and financial obligations. A residente (resident) had permanent residence, but did not have the rights and obligations of a vecino.

In the American colonies a vecino (or vecina) was sometimes a person of relatively high status, more than just free. In the "Indies" (Indias)—the American colonies such as the Viceroyalty of the Río de la Plata—a vecino had to be married, living in the location, a property-owner, and of good public reputation. There were military formations of vecinos, and only vecinos were summoned to an open cabildo (an extraordinary open meeting of the administrative council). Although many laws referred to vecinos, and others specified qualifications of residence, property, and respectability, the term vecino as such was in general use and not explicitly defined. Scholars have found even formerly enslaved women describing themselves as vecinas in court documents from the colonial era.

In the Viceroyalty, the status of vecino was important enough that the sons and daughters of vecinos who did not themselves qualify were referred to as hijo de vecino (son or daughter of a vecino), and entitled to some privileges. According to the relevant laws, the Leyes de Indias, IV, V, 8: "the sons [and daughters] and legitimate descendants of the residents are honoured with the title well-born sons [or daughters] from a known location [hijosdalgos de solar conocido] so that the population of that place (according to law 6 of book IV) and others of the Indies [i.e., Americas] should know them as such and as people of noble lineage, granting them all honours and privileges due to the well-born and gentlemen of Castile."

== See also ==
- Medieval household
