= Wellington Sandoval =

Ecuadorian politician

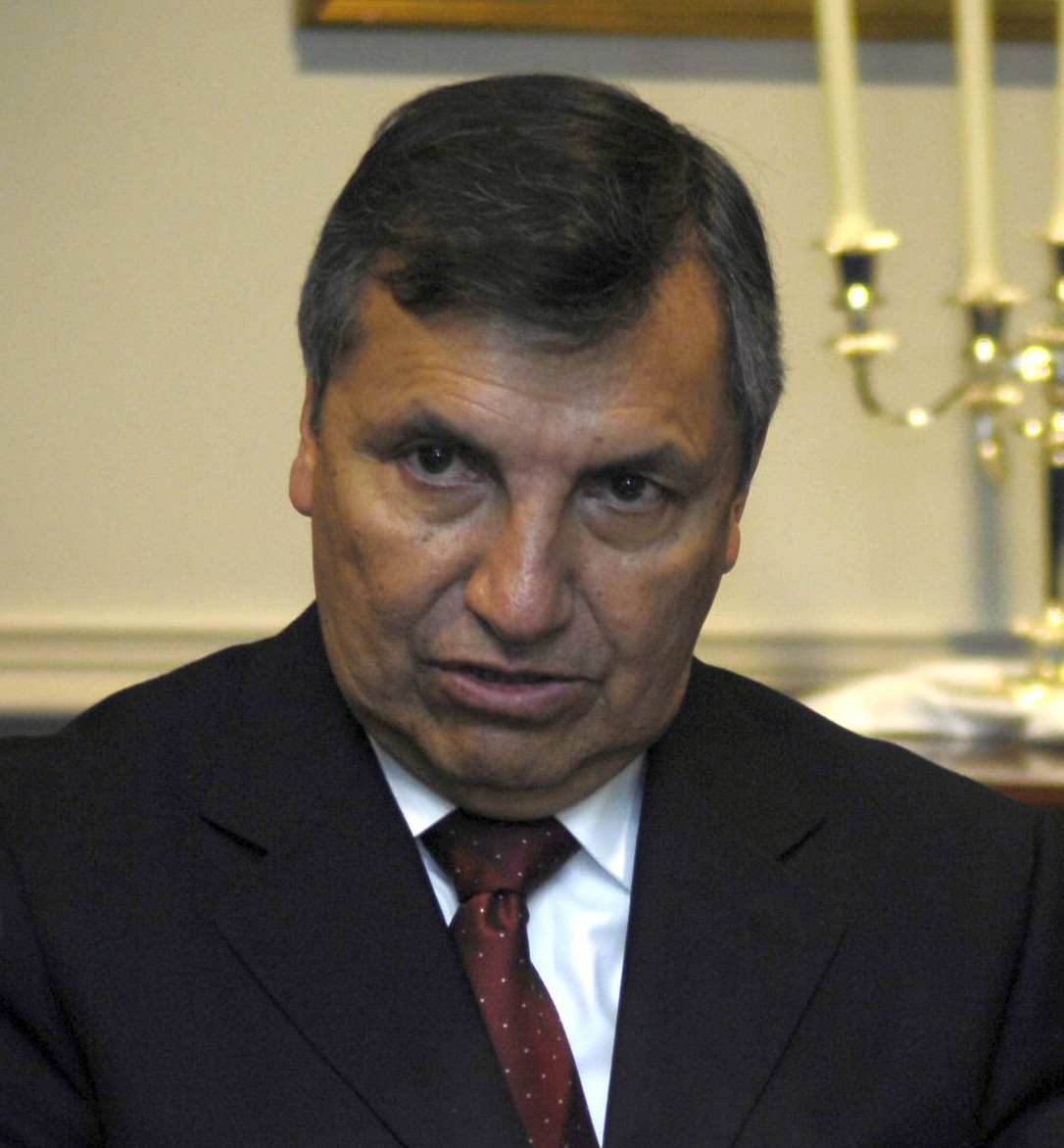
Wellington Sandoval at the Pentagon in 2008

Wellington Sandoval Córdova is a surgeon and former politician of Ecuador, who served as the Minister of National Defence between August 31, 2007 and April 9, 2008. Since October 2008 he has served as his country's Ambassador to Argentina.

He holds a PhD from the Central University of Ecuador.
