= 2021 Las Vegas Lights FC season =

Las Vegas Lights FC
2021 season
- Principal Owner: Brett Lashbrook
- Head coach: Steve Cherundolo
- Stadium: Cashman Field
- USL: Western Conference: 9th
- USL Cup Playoffs: DNQ
Home colors	Away colors

The 2021 Las Vegas Lights FC season was the club's fourth season, and their fourth season in the United Soccer League Championship (USLC), the second division of American soccer.

During the offseason, the Lights became the USL affiliate with Los Angeles FC of Major League Soccer. As a part of this deal, the Lights acquired to serve as head coach for the Lights, replacing former manager Frank Yallop.

== Squad ==
=== Roster ===
As of September 14, 2021

No.	Pos.	Nation	Player
1	GK	USA	Phillip Ejimadu
2	FW	USA	Julian Gaines
3	DF	SEN	Mohamed Traore
4	DF	USA	CC Uche
5	DF	SEN	Mamadou Fall
6	MF	USA	Nathan Sepulveda
7	MF	MEX	Bruce El-mesmari
10	MF	MEX	Danny Trejo
11	FW	SLV	Roberto Molina
12	GK	USA	Donovan Palomares
13	DF	USA	Diego Rosales
14	DF	USA	Eric Iloski
15	MF	USA	Tristan Weber
16	FW	USA	Danny Musovski
17	MF	GHA	Michael Yeboah (on loan from Accra Great Olympics)
18	DF	USA	Erik Dueñas
19	MF	USA	Bryce Duke
20	MF	SLE	Frank Daroma
21	FW	USA	Christian Torres
22	FW	GHA	Kwadwo Opoku
23	MF	USA	Christopher Jaime
24	DF	USA	Alvaro Quezada
25	DF	USA	Paul Son
26	FW	USA	Cal Jennings
27	DF	USA	Armando Avila
28	DF	USA	Tony Leone
29	MF	USA	Marvin Gamez
30	GK	SLV	Tomas Romero
31	MF	USA	Dylan Presto
33	FW	MEX	Julián Vázquez
34	MF	USA	Mauricio Gutierrez
35	GK	USA	Alex Rando
42	DF	ISR	Dekel Keinan
44	MF	CAN	Raheem Edwards

On loan from MLS affiliate side Los Angeles FC
On loan from the Los Angeles FC academy

=== Staff ===
Title	Name	Nation
Owner	Brett Lashbrook	United States
Head coach	Steve Cherundolo	United States

== Competitions ==
=== USL Championship ===
==== Standings ====
Pos	Div	Team	Pld	W	D	L	GF	GA	GD	Pts
11	PC	LA Galaxy II	32	11	6	15	55	57	−2	39
12	PC	Tacoma Defiance	32	10	9	13	37	41	−4	39
13	PC	Sacramento Republic FC	32	8	12	12	36	42	−6	36
14	MT	Real Monarchs	32	5	7	20	28	56	−28	22
15	PC	Las Vegas Lights FC	32	6	3	23	41	77	−36	21

Source: USL Championship
Rules for classification: 1) points; 2) head-to-head points; 3) head-to-head goal differential; 4) total points earned against in-division opponents; 5) total regular season wins against in-division opponents; 6) total goal differential against in-division opponents; 7) total goals scored against in-division opponents; 8) disciplinary points; 9) coin toss or drawing of lots.

==== Match results ====
On March 30, 2021, the Las Vegas Lights released a modified regular season schedule to compensate for the COVID-19 pandemic lockdowns.

All times are in Pacific Standard Time.

===== May =====
May 5 1	LA Galaxy II	5–0	Las Vegas Lights FC	Carson, California
7:30 PM	Ferkranus (yellow card) 34'; Koreniuk 48'; Uche 57' (o.g.); Aguirre 59'; Vom Steeg (yellow card) 62'; Hernandez 82'; Judd 90'	Report	Duke (yellow card) 61'; Sepulveda (yellow card) 76'; Uche (yellow card) 80'	Stadium: Dignity Health Sports Park; Referee: Mark Allatin

May 12 2	Sacramento Republic FC	3–1	Las Vegas Lights FC	Sacramento, California
7:00 PM	Formella 13'; Bone 66'; Villarreal 72'	Report	Musovski 51' (pen.)	Stadium: Heart Health Park; Attendance: 2,313

May 22 3	Phoenix Rising FC	5–1	Las Vegas Lights FC	Chandler, Arizona
7:30 PM	Dadashov 2', 55'; Farrell 39'; Lambert (yellow card) 45+1'; Moar 51'; Asante 63' (pen.)	Report	Jennings 22'	Stadium: Phoenix Rising Soccer Complex at Wild Horse Pass; Attendance: 5,000; Referee: Michael Radchuk
Note: Stadium limited to 50% capacity due to COVID-19 restrictions

May 29 4	San Diego Loyal SC	2–1	Las Vegas Lights FC	San Diego, California
7:30 PM	Guido 56'; Hertzog 87'	Report	Quezada 17'	Stadium: Torero Stadium; Attendance: 2,000

===== June =====
June 5 5	Las Vegas Lights FC	2–0	Tacoma Defiance	Las Vegas, Nevada
7:30 PM	Jennings 19'; Duke (yellow card) 56', (goal) 74'	Report	Kinzner (yellow card) 49'	Stadium: Cashman Field; Attendance: 7,298; Referee: Joseph Salinas

June 11 6	Las Vegas Lights FC	1–1	San Antonio FC	Las Vegas, Nevada
7:30 PM	Crisostomo (yellow card) 72'; Jennings 82' (pen.); Vázquez (yellow card) 88'	Report	Varela 9', (yellow card) 84'; Lindley (yellow card) 72'; Lema (yellow card) 90+3'	Stadium: Cashman Field; Attendance: 6,102; Referee: Lukasz Szpala

June 16 7	LA Galaxy II	3–4	Las Vegas Lights FC	Carson, California
7:30 PM	Judd 5', 41', 68': Perez (yellow card) 70'	Report	Quezada 9': Musovski 13'; Traore (yellow card) 16'; Molina (yellow card) 45+2'; Torres 61', 63'; Vazquez (yellow card) 90'; Romero (yellow card) 90+2'	Stadium: Dignity Health Sports Park; Referee: William Hoffman

June 19 8	Las Vegas Lights FC	1–3	Orange County SC	Las Vegas, Nevada
7:30 PM	Molina 44'	Report	Damus 48', 50'; Kiernan 74'	Stadium: Cashman Field; Attendance: 5,976

June 25 9	Las Vegas Lights FC	1–2	San Diego Loyal SC	Las Vegas, Nevada
7:30 PM		Report	Guido 7'; Berry 74'	Stadium: Cashman Field; Attendance: 5,762

===== July =====
July 3 10	Las Vegas Lights FC	1–0	Tacoma Defiance	Las Vegas, Nevada
7:30 PM	Musovski 5'; Uche (yellow card) 48'; Traore (yellow card) 82'	Report	Rayyan (yellow card) 67'; Anguiano (yellow card) 77'; Mendoza (yellow card) 88'	Stadium: Cashman Field; Referee: Gerald Flores

July 10 11	Oakland Roots SC	1–2	Las Vegas Lights FC	Livermore, California
7:00 PM	Weir 24'; Ward (yellow card) 79'; Diaz (yellow card) 88'	Report	Crisostomo (yellow card) 47', (goal) 55'; Leone 74'; Molina (yellow card) 90'; Traore (yellow card) 90+6'	Stadium: Las Positas College Turf Field; Attendance: 813; Referee: Ismir Pekmic

July 14 12	Las Vegas Lights FC	1–2	Sacramento Republic FC	Las Vegas, Nevada
7:30 PM	Gaines 74'	Report	Bone 5', 35'	Stadium: Cashman Field

July 17 13	El Paso Locomotive FC	1–0	Las Vegas Lights FC	El Paso, TX
6:30 PM	Yuma (yellow card) 35'; Gómez 58' (yellow card) 89'; Beaury (yellow card) 90+1'	Report	Daroma (yellow card) 79'	Stadium: Southwest University Park; Attendance: 7,019; Referee: Jeremy Scheer

July 23 14	Real Monarchs SLC	3–2	Las Vegas Lights FC	Herriman, Utah
7:00 PM	Wehan 38'; Mata 73'; Iloski 90+6' (pen.)	Report	Torres 23'; Jennings 61'	Stadium: Zions Bank Stadium; Attendance: 885

July 27 15	Las Vegas Lights FC	3–1	Orange County SC	Las Vegas, Nevada
7:30 PM	Jennings 18', 80'; Iloski 90'	Report	Iloski 39'	Stadium: Cashman Field; Attendance: 5,273

===== August =====
August 7 16	Las Vegas Lights FC	2–2	Phoenix Rising FC	Las Vegas, Nevada
7:30 PM	Molina 12'; Daroma (yellow card) 45+1'; Uche (yellow card) 71'; Traore 84'; Jaime (yellow card) 87'	Report	Moar 29' (pen.); Quinn 45+3'; Madrid (yellow card) 48'; Musa (yellow card) 68'; Lambert (yellow card) 90+2'	Stadium: Cashman Field; Attendance: 5,708; Referee: Melvin Rivas

August 14 17	Sacramento Republic FC	2–1	Las Vegas Lights FC	Sacramento, California
8:00 PM	Iwasa 48', 72'	Report	Fernandes 20' (o.g.)	Stadium: Heart Health Park; Attendance: 9,329

August 18 18	San Diego Loyal SC	5–1	Las Vegas Lights FC	San Diego, California
7:30 PM	Ibarra 2'; Blake 71'; Moshobane 72', 84'; Fodrey 88'	Report	Jennings 42'	Stadium: Torero Stadium; Attendance: 2,654

August 21 19	Las Vegas Lights FC	1–3	Oakland Roots SC	Las Vegas, Nevada
7:30 PM	Musovski 48'; Uche (yellow card) 85'	Report	Ornstil (yellow card) 30'; Hernández 52'; Enríquez 60'; Bokila 82'	Stadium: Cashman Field; Attendance: 4,220; Referee: Matthew Corrigan

August 27 20	Las Vegas Lights FC	2–3	LA Galaxy II	Las Vegas, Nevada
7:30 PM	Musovski (yellow card) 31', (goal) 36'; Sepulveda 89'; Leone (red card) 90+2'	Report	Judd 39'; Harvey (yellow card) 59'; Hernandez 70' (pen.); Dunbar (yellow card) 84'; Cabral 90'	Stadium: Cashman Field; Attendance: 7,292; Referee: Héctor Hernández

===== September =====
September 2 21	Tacoma Defiance	2–1	Las Vegas Lights FC	Tacoma, Washington
7:00 PM	Brewitt 36', (yellow card) 66'; Adeniran 86'; Anguiano (yellow card) 89'	Report	Iloski 62'	Stadium: Cheney Stadium; Attendance: 844; Referee: Lorenzo Hernandez

September 5 22	Las Vegas Lights FC	1–3	Sacramento Republic FC	Las Vegas, Nevada
7:00 PM	Jaime 12'	Report	Daroma 56' (o.g.); Fernandes 73'; Chavez 88'	Stadium: Cashman Field; Attendance: 5,354

September 8 23	Las Vegas Lights FC	0–1	Oakland Roots SC	Las Vegas, Nevada
7:00 PM		Report	Fall (yellow card) 41'; Rodriguez 63'; Hernández (yellow card) 90'; Diaz (yellow card) 90+1'	Stadium: Cashman Field; Attendance: 2,219; Referee: Mark Allatin

September 11 24	Orange County SC	3–0	Las Vegas Lights FC	Irvine, California
7:00 PM	Kiernan 45+3'; Enevoldsen 84' (pen.); Damus 89'	Report	Traore (yellow card) 50' (yellow-red card) 53'	Stadium: Championship Soccer Stadium; Attendance: 4,223

September 15 25	Phoenix Rising FC	4–1	Las Vegas Lights FC	Chandler, Arizona
7:30 PM	Quinn 2'; Moar 17'; Rodríguez 29' (yellow card) 70'; Bakero 82'	Report	Leone (yellow card) 16'; Vázquez 27'; Daroma (yellow card) 90'	Stadium: Phoenix Rising Soccer Complex at Wild Horse Pass; Attendance: 5,839; Referee: Luis Guardia

September 25 26	Las Vegas Lights FC	2–4	San Diego Loyal SC	Las Vegas, Nevada
7:00 PM	Trejo 27'; Jennings 73'	Report	Guido 39'; Moshobane 65', 69'; Williams 77'	Stadium: Cashman Field

===== October =====
October 2 27	Oakland Roots SC	2–2	Las Vegas Lights FC	Livermore, California
7:00 PM	Amarikwa (penalty missed) 18', 24', (yellow card) 59'; Leone 29' (o.g.); Fissore (yellow card) 80'	Report	Trejo 5'; Traore (yellow card) 16' (yellow-red card) 73'; Sepulveda (yellow card) 27'; Uche 89'; El-mesmari (yellow card) 90+4'	Stadium: Las Positas College Turf Field; Attendance: 5,044; Referee: Michael Radchuk

October 8 28	Las Vegas Lights FC	0–1	LA Galaxy II	Las Vegas, Nevada
7:00 PM	Trejo (yellow card) 55'	Report	Hernandez 8'; Zubak (yellow card) 89'	Stadium: Cashman Field; Referee: Thomas Snyder

October 13 29	Tacoma Defiance	0–1	Las Vegas Lights FC	Tacoma, Washington
7:00 PM		Report	El-mesmari 46'; Molina (yellow card) 81'	Stadium: Cheney Stadium; Attendance: 811; Referee: Matthew Thompson

October 16 30	Las Vegas Lights FC	3–6	Phoenix Rising FC	Las Vegas, Nevada
2:00 PM	Jennings 19', 41', 83'; Daroma (yellow card) 33'	Report	Egbo 4'; Calistri 16'; Moar 17', 70'; Loera (yellow card) 25'; King 52'; Farrell (yellow card) 75'; Seijas 85'	Stadium: Cashman Field; Referee: Calin Radosav

October 23 31	Orange County SC	2–1	Las Vegas Lights FC	Irvine, California
7:00 PM	Keinan 65' (o.g.); Damus 90+4'	Report	Keinan (yellow card) 12' (yellow-red card) 76'; Trejo 90+1'	Stadium: Championship Soccer Stadium; Attendance: 4,996; Referee: Matthew Thompson

October 30 32	Las Vegas Lights FC	1–2	Tampa Bay Rowdies	Las Vegas, Nevada
7:00 PM	Trejo 24'	Report	Dos Santos 12', 61'	Stadium: Cashman Field
