= 2022 Los Angeles FC season =

LAFC
2022 season
- General manager: John Thorrington
- Head coach: Steve Cherundolo
- Stadium: Banc of California Stadium
- MLS: Conference: 1st Overall: 1st
- MLS Cup Playoffs: Champions
- U.S. Open Cup: Round of 16
- Average home league attendance: 22,059
- Biggest win: LAFC 5–0 CLT (8/13)
- Biggest defeat: ATX 4–1 LAFC (8/26)
| Home colors | Away colors |

The 2022 Los Angeles FC season was the club's fifth season in Major League Soccer, the top tier of the American soccer pyramid. LAFC played its home matches at the Banc of California Stadium in the Exposition Park neighborhood of Los Angeles, California. Steve Cherundolo is the club's second head coach, joining on January 3, 2022.

The club won their second Supporters' Shield and first MLS Cup title, hosting the final at Banc of California Stadium on November 5, 2022.

== Squad ==
=== First-team roster ===
As of October 9, 2022

| No. | Name | Nationality | Pos | Date of birth (age) | Apps | Goals |
|---|---|---|---|---|---|---|
| 16 | Maxime Crépeau | Canada | GK | May 11, 1994 (age 32) | 33 | 0 |
| 30 | Tomas Romero (HG) | El Salvador | GK | December 19, 2000 (age 25) | 0 | 0 |
| 77 | John McCarthy | United States | GK | July 4, 1992 (age 34) | 1 | 0 |
| 2 | Franco Escobar | Argentina | DF | February 21, 1995 (age 31) | 19 | 1 |
| 3 | Jesús Murillo | Colombia | DF | February 18, 1994 (age 32) | 29 | 2 |
| 4 | Eddie Segura (INTL) | Colombia | DF | February 2, 1997 (age 29) | 14 | 0 |
| 5 | Mamadou Fall | Senegal | DF | November 21, 2002 (age 23) | 16 | 1 |
| 12 | Diego Palacios (INTL) | Ecuador | DF | July 12, 1999 (age 27) | 28 | 1 |
| 14 | Giorgio Chiellini (INTL) | Italy | DF | August 14, 1984 (age 42) | 11 | 0 |
| 15 | Mohamed Traore | Senegal | DF | August 15, 2002 (age 24) | 0 | 0 |
| 18 | Erik Dueñas (HG) | United States | DF | October 18, 2004 (age 21) | 0 | 0 |
| 24 | Ryan Hollingshead | United States | DF | April 16, 1991 (age 35) | 30 | 6 |
| 25 | Sebastien Ibeagha | United States | DF | January 21, 1992 (age 34) | 17 | 0 |
| 28 | Tony Leone (HG) | United States | DF | April 28, 2004 (age 22) | 0 | 0 |
| 80 | Julian Gaines | United States | DF | November 5, 2002 (age 23) | 0 | 0 |
| 6 | Ilie Sánchez | Spain | MF | November 21, 1990 (age 35) | 33 | 1 |
| 7 | Latif Blessing | Ghana | MF | December 30, 1996 (age 29) | 30 | 0 |
| 8 | Francisco Ginella (INTL) | Uruguay | MF | January 21, 1999 (age 27) | 15 | 0 |
| 20 | José Cifuentes (INTL) | Ecuador | MF | March 12, 1999 (age 27) | 33 | 7 |
| 23 | Kellyn Acosta | United States | MF | July 24, 1995 (age 31) | 32 | 2 |
| 31 | Danny Trejo | Mexico | MF | April 29, 1998 (age 28) | 3 | 0 |
| 32 | Sebastian Méndez | Ecuador | MF | April 26, 1997 (age 29) | 9 | 0 |
| 9 | Cristian Arango | Colombia | FW | March 9, 1995 (age 31) | 34 | 16 |
| 10 | Carlos Vela (Captain) (DP) | Mexico | FW | March 1, 1989 (age 37) | 32 | 12 |
| 11 | Gareth Bale | Wales | FW | July 16, 1989 (age 37) | 12 | 2 |
| 21 | Christian Torres (HG) | United States | FW | April 15, 2004 (age 22) | 0 | 0 |
| 22 | Kwadwo Opoku | Ghana | FW | July 13, 2001 (age 25) | 34 | 7 |
| 26 | Cal Jennings | United States | FW | May 17, 1997 (age 29) | 3 | 0 |
| 37 | Cristian Tello | Spain | FW | August 11, 1991 (age 35) | 4 | 0 |
| 99 | Denis Bouanga (DP) | Gabon | FW | November 11, 1994 (age 31) | 7 | 1 |

=== Coaching staff ===
As of February 8, 2022

Technical staff
| Head coach | (United States) Steve Cherundolo |
| Assistant coach | (Canada) Marc Dos Santos |
| Assistant coach | (United States) Ante Razov |
| Assistant/Goalkeeping coach | (North Macedonia) Oka Nikolov |
| Assistant coach/Performance director | (South Africa) Gavin Benjafield |
| Director of soccer operations | (United States) John Thorrington |
| Director of soccer operations | (United States) Will Kuntz |
| Director of football operations | (Mexico) Marco Garcés |

== Transfers ==
=== Transfers in ===
| Entry date | Position | Player | From club | Notes | Ref. |
|---|---|---|---|---|---|
| December 12, 2021 | DF | (Argentina) Franco Escobar | (United States) Atlanta United FC | Trade | |
| December 14, 2021 | FW | (Libya) Ismael Tajouri-Shradi | (United States) Charlotte FC | Trade | |
| January 12, 2022 | MF | (Spain) Ilie Sánchez | (United States) Sporting Kansas City | Free Agent | |
| January 14, 2022 | MF | (United States) Kellyn Acosta | (United States) Colorado Rapids | Trade | |
| January 20, 2022 | GK | (Canada) Maxime Crépeau | (Canada) Vancouver Whitecaps FC | Trade | |
| January 21, 2022 | GK | (United States) John McCarthy | (United States) Inter Miami CF | Free Agent | |
| February 10, 2022 | DF | (United States) Ryan Hollingshead | (United States) FC Dallas | Traded for Marco Farfan | |
| February 18, 2022 | DF | (Canada) Doneil Henry | (South Korea) Suwon Bluewings | Free Agent | |
| April 25, 2022 | FW | (Mexico) Nathan Ordaz | (United States) LAFC Academy | Academy signing | |
| June 13, 2022 | DF | (Italy) Giorgio Chiellini | (Italy) Juventus | Transfer | |
| June 25, 2022 | FW | (Wales) Gareth Bale | (Spain) Real Madrid | Transfer | |
| July 19, 2022 | MF | (Ecuador) Sebastian Méndez | (United States) Orlando City SC | Trade | |
| August 5, 2022 | FW | (Gabon) Denis Bouanga | (France) Saint-Étienne | Transfer | |
| August 26, 2022 | FW | (Spain) Cristian Tello | (Spain) Real Betis | Transfer | |

=== Transfers out ===
| Exit date | Position | Player | To club | Notes | Ref. |
|---|---|---|---|---|---|
| December 1, 2021 | GK | (England) Jamal Blackman | (England) Huddersfield Town | Declined contract options | |
| December 1, 2021 | MF | (United States) Daniel Crisostomo | Free Agent | Declined contract options | |
| December 1, 2021 | DF | (United States) Alvaro Quezada | Free Agent | Declined contract options | |
| December 15, 2021 | MF | (Canada) Raheem Edwards | (United States) LA Galaxy | Free Agent | |
| December 15, 2021 | DF | (United States) Jordan Harvey | Free Agent | Free Agent | |
| December 12, 2021 | GK | (Mexico) Pablo Sisniega | (United States) Charlotte FC | Trade | |
| December 13, 2021 | MF | (Colombia) Eduard Atuesta | (Brazil) Palmeiras | Transfer | |
| December 14, 2021 | DF | (United States) Tristan Blackmon | (United States) Charlotte FC | MLS Expansion Draft pick | |
| January 4, 2022 | MF | (United States) Bryce Duke | (United States) Inter Miami CF | Trade | |
| February 10, 2022 | DF | (United States) Marco Farfan | (United States) FC Dallas | Traded for Ryan Hollingshead | |
| March 18, 2022 | DF | (South Korea) Kim Moon-hwan | (South Korea) Jeonbuk Hyundai | Transfer | |
| April 15, 2022 | FW | (Uruguay) Diego Rossi | (Turkey) Fenerbahçe | Exercised option to buy | |
| July 3, 2022 | DF | (Canada) Doneil Henry | (Canada) Toronto FC | Waived | |
| July 18, 2022 | MF | (Uruguay) Francisco Ginella | (Uruguay) Nacional | Loan | |
| August 3, 2022 | FW | (United States) Danny Musovski | (United States) Real Salt Lake | Trade | |
| August 5, 2022 | FW | (Libya) Ismael Tajouri-Shradi | (United States) New England Revolution | Trade | |
| August 24, 2022 | FW | (Uruguay) Brian Rodríguez | (Mexico) América | Transfer | |
| August 25, 2022 | DF | (Senegal) Mamadou Fall | (Spain) Villarreal B | Loan | |

=== Draft picks ===
Los Angeles FC did not participate in the 2022 MLS Superdraft as the club traded their draft picks in exchange for new players and General Allocation Money.

| Round | # | Position | Player | College/Club Team | Reference |
|---|---|---|---|---|---|
| 1 | | | | | |
| 2 | | | | | |
| 3 | | | | | |

== Competitions ==
Win Draw Loss

=== Preseason ===
| January 29 Preseason 1 | Los Angeles FC | 1–1 | New England Revolution | Los Angeles |
| 12:00 PM PT | Murillo (red card) 33'; Fall 86' (pen.) | LAFC Tweet; LAFC notes | Buksa 44' | Stadium: Banc of California Stadium; Attendance: Not reported Referee: Malik Badawi |

| February 2 Preseason 2 | Los Angeles FC | 1–2 | Toronto FC | Irvine, California |
| 11:00 AM PT | Ordaz 84' | Report | Achara 66'; Perruzza 74' | Stadium: University of California, Irvine; Attendance: 0 |
Note: Match was played behind closed doors

==== Coachella Valley Invitational ====
| February 15 Preseason 3 | Los Angeles FC | 0–2 | D.C. United | Indio, California |
| 3:30 PM PT | | Report | 9' (pen.); Skundrich 77' | Stadium: Empire Polo Club; Attendance: 0 |
Note: Match was played behind closed doors

| February 19 Preseason 4 | Los Angeles FC | 6–1 | New York Red Bulls | Indio, California |
| 12:00 PM PT | Rodríguez 28', 34'; 31' (o.g.); Vela 46'; Fall 58'; Opoku 60' | Report | Klimala 9' (pen.) | Stadium: Empire Polo Club; Attendance: 0 |
Note: Match was played behind closed doors

=== MLS ===
==== Standings ====
===== Western Conference =====
| Pos | Team | Pld | W | L | T | GF | GA | GD | Pts | Qualification |
|---|---|---|---|---|---|---|---|---|---|---|
| 1 | Los Angeles FC | 34 | 21 | 9 | 4 | 66 | 38 | +28 | 67 | Qualification for the 2023 Campeones Cup, CONCACAF Champions League & conference semifinals |
| 2 | Austin FC | 34 | 16 | 10 | 8 | 65 | 49 | +16 | 56 | Qualification for the first round & CONCACAF Champions League |
| 3 | FC Dallas | 34 | 14 | 9 | 11 | 48 | 37 | +11 | 53 | Qualification for the first round |
| 4 | LA Galaxy | 34 | 14 | 12 | 8 | 58 | 51 | +7 | 50 | Qualification for the first round |
| 5 | Nashville SC | 34 | 13 | 10 | 11 | 52 | 41 | +11 | 50 | Qualification for the first round |

Source: MLS
Rules for classification: 1) points; 2) total wins; 3) total goal differential; 4) total goals scored; 5) fewer disciplinary points; 6) away goal differential; 7) away goals scored; 8) home goals differential; 9) home goals scored; 10) coin toss (2 clubs tied) or drawing of lots (≥3 clubs tied)

===== Overall =====
| Pos | Team | Pld | W | L | T | GF | GA | GD | Pts | Qualification |
|---|---|---|---|---|---|---|---|---|---|---|
| 1 | Los Angeles FC (C, S) | 34 | 21 | 9 | 4 | 66 | 38 | +28 | 67 | Qualification for the 2023 CONCACAF Champions League (Note: As 2022 MLS Cup champions and 2022 MLS Supporters' Shield champions (USA1)) |
| 2 | Philadelphia Union | 34 | 19 | 5 | 10 | 72 | 26 | +46 | 67 | Qualification for the 2023 CONCACAF Champions League (Note: As 2022 Eastern Conference regular season champions (USA2)) |
| 3 | CF Montréal (Note: Canadian clubs cannot qualify for the 2023 CONCACAF Champions League through the MLS regular season or playoffs.) | 34 | 20 | 9 | 5 | 63 | 50 | +13 | 65 | |
| 4 | Austin FC | 34 | 16 | 10 | 8 | 65 | 49 | +16 | 56 | Qualification for the 2023 CONCACAF Champions League (Note: As highest-ranked U.S. based Division I club (based on 2022 MLS regular season record) not already qualified (USA3)) |
| 5 | New York City FC | 34 | 16 | 11 | 7 | 57 | 41 | +16 | 55 | |

Source: MLS
Rules for classification: 1) points; 2) total wins; 3) total goal differential; 4) total goals scored; 5) fewer disciplinary points; 6) away goal differential; 7) away goals scored; 8) home goals differential; 9) home goals scored; 10) coin toss (2 clubs tied) or drawing of lots (≥3 clubs tied)
(C) Champions; (S) Supporters' Shield winners

==== Results by round ====
| Round | 1 | 2 | 3 | 4 | 5 | 6 | 7 | 8 | 9 | 10 | 11 | 12 | 13 | 14 | 15 | 16 | 17 | 18 | 19 | 20 | 21 | 22 | 23 | 24 | 25 | 26 | 27 | 28 | 29 | 30 | 31 | 32 | 33 | 34 |
|---|---|---|---|---|---|---|---|---|---|---|---|---|---|---|---|---|---|---|---|---|---|---|---|---|---|---|---|---|---|---|---|---|---|---|
| Stadium | H | H | A | H | A | A | H | A | H | H | A | H | A | H | A | H | H | A | H | A | A | H | A | H | H | A | A | A | H | A | A | H | A | H |
| Result | W | D | W | W | W | L | W | W | W | D | L | L | W | W | D | W | W | L | W | W | W | W | W | W | W | L | L | L | W | L | D | W | W | L |

Source: Los Angeles FC schedule
A = Away; H = Home; W = Win; D = Draw; L = Loss

==== Matches ====
All matches are in Pacific time

| February 26 1 | Los Angeles FC | 3–0 | Colorado Rapids | Los Angeles |
| 12:30 PM PT | Vela 29' (pen.), 35', 50'; Fall (yellow card) 58'; Crépeau (yellow card) 58'; Cifuentes (yellow card) 81'; Arango (yellow card) 90' | Report | Lewis (yellow card) 5' | Stadium: Banc of California Stadium; Attendance: 22,010; Referee: Armando Villarreal |

| March 6 2 | Los Angeles FC | 1–1 | Portland Timbers | Los Angeles |
| 7:00 PM PT | Hollingshead (yellow card) 25'; Sánchez (yellow card) 78'; Fall 90+3' | Report | Y. Chará 18'; Bravo (yellow card) 36' (yellow-red card) 62'; Asprilla (yellow card) 39'; Van Rankin (yellow card) 45+3'; Fochive (yellow card) 65'; D. Chará (yellow card) 90+2' | Stadium: Banc of California Stadium; Attendance: 22,102; Referee: Ismail Elfath |

| March 12 3 | Inter Miami CF | 0–2 | Los Angeles FC | Fort Lauderdale, Florida |
| 10:30 AM PT | Adams (yellow card) 29'; Shea (red card) 45+2'; Lassiter (yellow card) 73'; Azcona (yellow card) 90+2' | | Moon-hwan (yellow card) 11'; Sánchez (yellow card) 15'; Opoku 45'; Fall (yellow card) 62'; Tajouri-Shradi 82'; Henry (yellow card) 88' | Stadium: DRV PNK Stadium; Attendance: 11,465; Referee: Ted Unkel |

| March 20 4 | Los Angeles FC | 3–1 | Vancouver Whitecaps FC | Los Angeles |
| 7:00 PM PT | Hollingshead 27', 70'; Vela (yellow card) 33', (goal) 38'; Fall (yellow card) 61'; Sánchez (yellow card) 89' | | Blackmon 12'; Veselinović (yellow card) 20'; Teibert (yellow card) 55' | Stadium: Banc of California Stadium; Attendance: 22,065; Referee: Guido Gonzales Jr. |

| April 2 5 | Orlando City SC | 2–4 | Los Angeles FC | Orlando, Florida |
| 4:30 PM PT | Araújo (yellow card) 31'; Pato 36'; Moutinho 45' | Report | Ginella (yellow card) 10'; Murillo (yellow card) 13', (goal) 38'; Rodríguez 24'; Sánchez 51'; Palacios (yellow card) 59'; Cifuentes (yellow card) 71'; Fall (yellow card) 77'; Opoku 90+3' | Stadium: Exploria Stadium; Attendance: 16,753; Referee: Joseph Dickerson |

| April 9 6 | LA Galaxy | 2–1 | Los Angeles FC | Carson, California |
| 4:30 PM PT, FOX | Hernández 13', (yellow card) 90+3'; Coulibaly 31', (yellow card) 63'; Araujo (yellow card) 37'; Williams (yellow card) 70'; Costa (yellow card) 85'; Leerdam (yellow card) 85'; Álvarez (yellow card) 89' | Report | Hollingshead (yellow card) 49'; Arango 79', (yellow card) 90+10'; Murillo (yellow card) 90+4' | Stadium: Dignity Health Sports Park; Attendance: 25,174; Referee: Chris Penso |

| April 17 7 | Los Angeles FC | 3–1 | Sporting Kansas City | Los Angeles |
| 1:00 PM PT, ESPN | Murillo (yellow card) 8'; Fall (yellow card) 25'; Arango 44'; Palacios (yellow card) 51'; Tajouri-Shradi 70'; Cifuentes 78' | Report | Espinoza (yellow card) 6'; Palacios 28' (o.g.); Russell (yellow card) 43'; Isimat-Mirin (yellow card) 80' | Stadium: Banc of California Stadium; Attendance: 22,097; Referee: Armando Villarreal |

| April 24 8 | FC Cincinnati | 1–2 | Los Angeles FC | Cincinnati, Ohio |
| 2:00 PM PT, FS1 | Harris (yellow card) 19'; Acosta 45+3'; Badji (yellow card) 90+4'; Blackett (yellow card) 90+7' | Report | Henry (yellow card) 6'; Ibeagha (yellow card) 33'; Acosta 59'; Musovski 79', (yellow card) 90+4'; Crépeau (yellow card) 90+7' | Stadium: TQL Stadium; Attendance: 20,883; Referee: Ismail Elfath |

| May 1 9 | Los Angeles FC | 2–0 | Minnesota United FC | Los Angeles |
| 7:00 PM PT, FS1 | Hollingshead 82'; Cifuentes 90' | | Dibassy (yellow card) 69'; Arriaga (yellow card) 85' | Stadium: Banc of California Stadium; Attendance: 22,010; Referee: Allen Chapman |

| May 7 10 | Los Angeles FC | 2–2 | Philadelphia Union | Los Angeles |
| 8:00 PM PT | Opoku 56'; Palacios (yellow card) 76'; Escobar 82' | | Gazdag 9'; Carranza 67'; Santos (yellow card) 83'; Elliott (yellow card) 90+4' | Stadium: Banc of California Stadium; Attendance: 22,022; Referee: Jair Marrufo |

| May 14 11 | Colorado Rapids | 2–0 | Los Angeles FC | Commerce City, Colorado |
| 12:30 PM PT | Zardes 17' (pen.); Rubio 28' (pen.); B. Acosta (yellow card) 29'; Abubakar (yellow card) 88' | | Ibeagha (yellow card) 16'; Cifuentes (yellow card) 22'; Arango (yellow card) 24' | Stadium: Dick's Sporting Goods Park; Attendance: 15,022; Referee: Ted Unkel |

| May 18 12 | Los Angeles FC | 1–2 | Austin FC | Los Angeles |
| 7:30 PM PT | Acosta (yellow card) 39'; Cifuentes (yellow card) 39'; Murillo (yellow card) 63'; Vela 86' (pen.) | | Gabrielsen 13'; Valencia (yellow card) 37'; Wolff (yellow card) 50'; Fagúndez 80'; Stuver (yellow card) 85'; Driussi (yellow card) 89'; Keller (yellow card) 90+7' | Stadium: Banc of California Stadium; Attendance: 22,034; Referee: Armando Villarreal |

| May 21 13 | Columbus Crew | 0–2 | Los Angeles FC | Columbus, Ohio |
| 12:30 PM PT | | | Acosta (yellow card) 35'; Ibeagha (yellow card) 41'; Murillo (yellow card) 55'; Vela 62'; Cifuentes 73'; Palacios (yellow card) 75'; Sánchez (yellow card) 75'; Henry (yellow card) 90+5' | Stadium: Lower.com Field; Attendance: 19,649; Referee: Victor Rivas |
Note: Match was delayed until 3 PM PT due to weather conditions.

| May 28 14 | Los Angeles FC | 3–2 | San Jose Earthquakes | Los Angeles |
| 3:00 PM PT | Arango 7' (pen.); Hollingshead 13'; Rodríguez (yellow card) 19', (goal) 47'; Musovski (yellow card) 73'; Acosta (yellow card) 77'; Crisostomo (yellow card) 90+4' | Report | Ebobisse 16', 31'; Espinoza (yellow card) 17' | Stadium: Banc of California Stadium; Attendance: 22,007; Referee: Ismail Elfath |

| June 18 15 | Seattle Sounders FC | 1–1 | Los Angeles FC | Seattle, Washington |
| 12:00 PM PT, ABC | Rusnák 58'; Lodeiro (yellow card) 77' | Report | Cifuentes (yellow card) 16'; Arango 79' | Stadium: Lumen Field; Attendance: 34,642; Referee: Allen Chapman |

| June 26 16 | Los Angeles FC | 2–0 | New York Red Bulls | Los Angeles |
| 12:00 PM PT, ABC | Arango 67'; Palacios 70'; Acosta (yellow card) 83' | Report | D. Nealis (yellow card) 45+2' | Stadium: Banc of California Stadium; Referee: Joseph Dickerson |

| June 29 17 | Los Angeles FC | 3–1 | FC Dallas | Los Angeles |
| 7:30 PM PT | Musovski 23'; Arango 57'; Cifuentes (yellow card) 82'; Opoku 86' | Report | Servania (yellow card) 12'; Ferreira 38'; Tafari (yellow card) 44' | Stadium: Banc of California Stadium; Attendance: 22,014; Referee: Marcos DeOliveira |

| July 2 18 | Vancouver Whitecaps FC | 1–0 | Los Angeles FC | Vancouver, British Columbia |
| 7:00 PM PT | Cavallini (yellow card) 27'; Gauld (yellow card) 55'; Cubas 89' | Report | Murillo (yellow card) 39'; Fall (yellow card) 88' | Stadium: BC Place; Attendance: 18,292; Referee: Guido Gonzales Jr. |

| July 8 19 | Los Angeles FC | 3–2 | LA Galaxy | Los Angeles |
| 7:00 PM PT, ESPN | Cifuentes 17', 70'; Palacios (yellow card) 50'; Arango 72' | Report | Álvarez (yellow card) 8'; Coulibaly (yellow card) 45+3'; Grandsir 55'; Edwards (yellow card) 59'; Raveloson 81'; Williams (yellow card) 90+1' | Stadium: Banc of California Stadium; Attendance: 22,231; Referee: Armando Villarreal |

| July 17 20 | Nashville SC | 1–2 | Los Angeles FC | Nashville, Tennessee |
| 5:30 PM PT | Muyl (yellow card) 13'; Anunga (yellow card) 18'; Mukhtar 43' (pen.); Leal (yellow card) 89' | Report | Arango 27'; Cifuentes 46'; Escobar (yellow card) 73'; Blessing (yellow card) 83' | Stadium: Geodis Park; Attendance: 30,109; Referee: Drew Fischer |

| July 23 21 | Sporting Kansas City | 0–2 | Los Angeles FC | Kansas City, Kansas |
| 5:30 PM PT | | Report | Acosta (yellow card) 5'; Arango 56'; Vela (yellow card) 71'; Bale 83'; Hollingshead (yellow card) 90+6' | Stadium: Children's Mercy Park; Attendance: 20,142; Referee: Lukasz Szpala |

| July 29 22 | Los Angeles FC | 2–1 | Seattle Sounders FC | Los Angeles |
| 8:00 PM PT, FS1 | Opoku 35'; Vela 43'; Palacios (yellow card) 45' | Report | Murillo 14' (o.g.); Montero (yellow card) 76'; Arreaga (yellow card) 81' | Stadium: Banc of California Stadium; Attendance: 22,111; Referee: Joe Dickerson |

| August 6 23 | Real Salt Lake | 1–4 | Los Angeles FC | Sandy, Utah |
| 7:00 PM PT | Córdova 12' | Report | Arango 9', 60'; Acosta 17', (yellow card) 40'; Chiellini (yellow card) 69'; Bale 87' | Stadium: Rio Tinto Stadium; Attendance: 21,810; Referee: Victor Rivas |

| August 13 24 | Los Angeles FC | 5–0 | Charlotte FC | Los Angeles |
| 7:30 PM PT | Murillo 49'; Cifuentes 59'; Vela 73'; Arango 76'; Walkes 90+2' (o.g.) | Report | Alcívar (yellow card) 62' | Stadium: Banc of California Stadium; Attendance: 22,140; Referee: Chris Penso |

| August 16 25 | Los Angeles FC | 1–0 | D.C. United | Los Angeles |
| 7:30 PM PT | Opoku 67'; Escobar (yellow card) 89' | Report | Hopkins (yellow card) 28'; Najar (yellow card) 43'; Morrison (yellow card) 44'; Birnbaum (yellow card) 50' (yellow-red card) 60'; Ochoa (yellow card) 59' | Stadium: Banc of California Stadium; Attendance: 22,063; Referee: Ramy Touchan |
Note: Match was originally scheduled to take place on August 17.

| August 20 26 | San Jose Earthquakes | 2–1 | Los Angeles FC | San Jose, California |
| 7:00 PM PT | Kikanovic 14', (yellow card) 60'; Thompson (yellow card) 30'; Nathan (yellow card) 31'; Remedi (yellow card) 74'; Cowell 77' | Report | Ibeagha (yellow card) 42'; Opoku 54'; Acosta (yellow card) 67'; Sánchez (yellow card) 67' (yellow-red card) 79'; Cifuentes (yellow card) 86'; Arango (yellow card) 90+6' | Stadium: PayPal Park; Attendance: 18,000; Referee: Michael Radchuk |

| August 26 27 | Austin FC | 4–1 | Los Angeles FC | Austin, Texas |
| 5:00 PM PT, ESPN | Fagúndez 32', (yellow card) 39'; Urruti (yellow card) 39', (goal) 47', 51'; Driussi 59' | Report | Segura (yellow card) 30'; Crépeau (yellow card) 40'; Murillo (yellow card) 57'; Arango 61' | Stadium: Q2 Stadium; Attendance: 20,738; Referee: Alex Chilowicz |

| August 31 28 | Houston Dynamo FC | 2–1 | Los Angeles FC | Houston, Texas |
| 5:30 PM PT | Ferreira 12' (pen.); Dorsey 75'; Cerén (yellow card) 90+3' (yellow-red card) 90+7'; Clark (yellow card) 90+6' | Report | Sánchez (yellow card) 11'; Arango 11'; Acosta (yellow card) 90+3' | Stadium: PNC Stadium; Attendance: 21,284; Referee: Matt Conger |

| September 4 29 | Los Angeles FC | 2–0 | Real Salt Lake | Los Angeles |
| 7:30 PM PT | Hollingshead 49'; Arango 68'; Murillo (yellow card) 72'; Cifuentes (yellow card) 90+4'; Palacios (yellow card) 90+5' | | Meram (yellow card) 90+5' | Stadium: Banc of California Stadium; Attendance: 22,199; Referee: Lukasz Szpala |

| September 10 30 | FC Dallas | 2–1 | Los Angeles FC | Frisco, Texas |
| 5:30 PM PT | Ferreira 78', 81' | | Palacios (yellow card) 8'; Hollingshead (red card) 13'; Escobar (yellow card) 35'; Arango 45+4' | Stadium: Toyota Stadium; Attendance: 19,096; Referee: Jon Freemon |

| September 13 31 | Minnesota United FC | 1–1 | Los Angeles FC | Saint Paul, Minnesota |
| 5:00 PM PT | Kallman 45'; Danladi (yellow card) 52'; Reynoso (yellow card) 88' | | Arango (yellow card) 37'; Vela 64' | Stadium: Allianz Field; Attendance: 19,861; Referee: Timothy Ford |

| September 18 32 | Los Angeles FC | 3–1 | Houston Dynamo FC | Los Angeles |
| 7:30 PM PT | Vela 8' (pen.), 45+4' (pen.); Hollingshead 52' | | Dorsey (yellow card) 7'; Baird 24' | Stadium: Banc of California Stadium; Attendance: 22,131; Referee: Kevin Stott |

| October 2 33 | Portland Timbers | 1–2 | Los Angeles FC | Portland, Oregon |
| 12:00 PM PT, ABC | Paredes (yellow card) 48'; Župarić (yellow card) 63'; Asprilla 81' | Report | Vela 51'; Segura (yellow card) 57'; Murillo (yellow card) 90+1'; Bouanga 90+5' | Stadium: Providence Park; Attendance: 25,218; Referee: Ismail Elfath |

| October 9 34 | Los Angeles FC | 0–1 | Nashville SC | Los Angeles |
| 2:00 PM PT | | Report | McCarty (yellow card) 9'; Bunbury 53'; Anunga (yellow card) 55'; Sapong (yellow card) 81' | Stadium: Banc of California Stadium; Attendance: 22,205; Referee: Ted Unkel |

=== MLS Cup Playoffs ===
| October 20 Conference Semi-finals | Los Angeles FC | 3–2 | LA Galaxy | Los Angeles |
| 6:00 PM PT | Bouanga 23', 80'; Palacios (yellow card) 56'; Murillo (yellow card) 58'; Vela (yellow card) 63'; Arango 90+3' | Report | Puig (yellow card) 12'; Grandsir 44'; Edwards (yellow card) 45+3'; Joveljić 85' | Stadium: Banc of California Stadium; Attendance: 22,305; Referee: Allen Chapman |

| October 30 Conference Finals | Los Angeles FC | 3–0 | Austin FC | Los Angeles |
| 12:00 PM PT | Arango 29'; Vela (yellow card) 54'; Urruti 62' (o.g.); Opoku 81' | Report | Lima (yellow card) 31'; Rigoni (yellow card) 34'; Urruti (yellow card) 90' | Stadium: Banc of California Stadium; Attendance: 22,175; Referee: Armando Villarreal |

==== MLS Cup ====
| November 5 MLS Cup | Los Angeles FC | 3–3 (a.e.t.) (3–0 p) | Philadelphia Union | Los Angeles |
| 1:00 PM PT | Acosta 28'; Cifuentes (yellow card) 65'; Murillo 83'; Ibeagha (yellow card) 87'; Crépeau (red card) 116'; Bale 120+8' | Report | Elliott (yellow card) 14', (goal) 85', 120+4'; Gazdag 59'; Carranza (yellow card) 90+1' | Stadium: Banc of California Stadium; Attendance: 22,384; Referee: Ismail Elfath |
| | Penalties |
| | Tello (penalty missed); Bouanga (penalty scored); Hollingshead (penalty scored); Ilie (penalty scored) | | (penalty missed) Gazdag; (penalty missed) Martínez; (penalty missed) Wagner |

=== U.S. Open Cup ===
Los Angeles FC will enter the Open Cup in the Third Round.

| April 20 Third Round | Los Angeles FC (California) | 5–1 | (California) Orange County SC | Los Angeles |
| 7:30 PM PT | Musovski 13', 71'; Arango 34', 45'; Palacios (yellow card) 54'; Jennings 68' | | Rocha (yellow card) 45+3'; Torres 73', (yellow card) 77' | Stadium: Banc of California Stadium; Referee: Samantha Martinez |

| May 10 Round of 32 | Los Angeles FC (California) | 2–0 | (Oregon) Portland Timbers | Los Angeles |
| 7:00 PM PT | Arango 32'; Fall 54'; Musovski (yellow card) 60' | | Fogaça (yellow card) 65' | Stadium: Banc of California Stadium; Attendance: 11,014; Referee: Mark Allatin |

| May 25 Round of 16 | LA Galaxy (California) | 3–1 | (California) Los Angeles FC | Carson, California |
| 7:30 pm PT | Delgado (yellow card) 10'; Hernández (yellow card) 39', (goal) 57'; Cabral 51', (yellow card) 55'; Joveljić 81' | Report | Acosta (yellow card) 39'; Hollingshead (yellow card) 64', (goal) 85' | Stadium: Dignity Health Sports Park; Attendance: 24,174; Referee: Brandon Stevis |

=== Leagues Cup ===
| August 3 Showcase Match | Los Angeles FC (United States) | 0–0 (5–6 p) | (Mexico) América | Inglewood, California |
| 8:15 PM PT | Fall (yellow card) 43'; Escobar (yellow card) 76' | | | Stadium: SoFi Stadium; Attendance: 71,189; Referee: Victor Rivas (United States) |
| | Penalties |
| | Palacios (penalty missed); Vela (penalty scored); Jennings (penalty scored); Sánchez (penalty scored); Bale (penalty scored); Escobar (penalty scored); Cifuentes (penalty missed) | | (penalty scored) Valdez; (penalty scored) Martín; (penalty missed) Zendejas; (penalty scored) Campos; (penalty scored) Rodríguez; (penalty scored) Cáceres; (penalty scored) Lara |
