= 2021 Los Angeles FC season =

LAFC
2021 season
- General manager: John Thorrington
- Head coach: Bob Bradley
- Stadium: Banc of California Stadium
- MLS: Conference: 9th Overall: 19th
- MLS Cup Playoffs: Did not qualify
- U.S. Open Cup: Canceled
- Top goalscorer: League: Cristian Arango (14); All: Cristian Arango (14)
- Biggest win: LAFC 4–0 SKC, September 3rd
- Biggest defeat: COL 5–2 LAFC, November 7th
Home colors	Away colors

The 2021 Los Angeles FC season was the club's fourth season in Major League Soccer, the top tier of the American soccer pyramid. LAFC played its home matches at the Banc of California Stadium in the Exposition Park neighborhood of Los Angeles, California.

== Squad ==
=== First-team roster ===
As of November 7, 2021

No.	Name	Nationality	Pos	Date of birth (age)	Apps	Goals
1	Jamal Blackman (INTL)	England	GK	October 27, 1993 (age 33)	8	0
23	Pablo Sisniega	Mexico	GK	July 7, 1995 (age 31)	8	0
30	Tomas Romero (HG)	El Salvador	GK	December 19, 2000 (age 25)	18	0
2	Jordan Harvey	United States	DF	January 28, 1984 (age 42)	4	0
3	Mohamed Traore	Senegal	DF	August 15, 2002 (age 24)	0	0
4	Eddie Segura (INTL)	Colombia	DF	February 2, 1997 (age 29)	15	0
5	Mamadou Fall	Senegal	DF	November 21, 2002 (age 23)	19	4
12	Diego Palacios (INTL)	Ecuador	DF	July 12, 1999 (age 27)	27	0
18	Erik Dueñas (HG)	United States	DF	October 18, 2004 (age 22)	0	0
24	Alvaro Quezada	United States	DF	March 4, 1999 (age 27)	1	0
25	Sebastien Ibeagha	United States	DF	January 21, 1992 (age 34)	13	0
27	Tristan Blackmon	United States	DF	August 12, 1996 (age 30)	22	1
28	Tony Leone (HG)	United States	DF	April 28, 2004 (age 22)	0	0
32	Marco Farfan	United States	DF	November 12, 1998 (age 27)	29	0
33	Kim Moon-hwan	South Korea	DF	August 1, 1995 (age 31)	27	1
94	Jesús David Murillo	Colombia	DF	February 18, 1994 (age 32)	32	0
7	Latif Blessing	Ghana	MF	December 30, 1996 (age 29)	30	2
8	Francisco Ginella (INTL)	Uruguay	MF	January 21, 1999 (age 27)	17	0
11	José Cifuentes (INTL)	Ecuador	MF	March 12, 1999 (age 27)	32	5
15	Daniel Crisostomo	United States	MF	January 16, 1997 (age 29)	10	0
19	Bryce Duke (HG)	United States	MF	February 28, 2001 (age 25)	15	0
20	Eduard Atuesta	Colombia	MF	June 18, 1997 (age 29)	24	2
44	Raheem Edwards	Canada	MF	July 17, 1995 (age 31)	27	0
9	Diego Rossi (DP)	Uruguay	FW	March 5, 1998 (age 28)	19	6
10	Carlos Vela (DP)	Mexico	FW	March 1, 1989 (age 37)	20	5
16	Danny Musovski	United States	FW	November 30, 1995 (age 30)	22	4
17	Brian Rodríguez (DP, INTL)	Uruguay	FW	May 20, 2000 (age 26)	15	4
21	Christian Torres (HG)	United States	FW	April 15, 2004 (age 22)	0	0
22	Kwadwo Opoku	Ghana	FW	July 13, 2001 (age 25)	4	0
26	Cal Jennings	United States	FW	May 17, 1997 (age 29)	6	0
29	Cristian Arango	Colombia	FW	March 9, 1995 (age 31)	17	14
45	Michee Ngalina	Democratic Republic of the Congo	FW	April 6, 2000 (age 26)	2	0

=== Coaching staff ===
As of January 16, 2021

Technical staff
Head coach	Bob Bradley
Assistant coach	Mike Sorber
Assistant coach	Ante Razov
Assistant coach	Kenny Arena
Assistant coach	Gavin Benjafield
Goalkeeping coach	Zak Abdel
Director of soccer operations	John Thorrington
Director of soccer operations	Will Kuntz

== Transfers ==
=== Transfers in ===
Entry date	Position	Player	From club	Notes	Ref.
December 17, 2020	FW	(Canada) Raheem Edwards	(United States) Minnesota United FC	Re-Entry Draft	
December 13, 2020	DF	(United States) Marco Farfan	(United States) Portland Timbers	Trade	
January 11, 2021	FW	(United States) Corey Baird	(United States) Real Salt Lake	Trade	
January 11, 2021	DF	(South Korea) Kim Moon-hwan	(South Korea) Busan IPark	Transfer	
January 21, 2021	GK	(El Salvador) Tomas Romero	(United States) Philadelphia Union II	Trade	
January 22, 2021	DF	(Colombia) Jesús David Murillo	(Colombia) Independiente Medellín	Exercised option to buy	
March 9, 2021	FW	(United States) Cal Jennings	(United States) Indy Eleven	Transfer	
April 24, 2021	DF	(United States) Alvaro Quezada	(United States) UC Irvine	Signed draft pick	
June 4, 2021	DF	(Senegal) Mamadou Fall	Montverde Academy	Signed using MLS waivers	
August 2, 2021	FW	(Colombia) Cristian Arango	(Colombia) Millonarios F.C.	Transfer	
August 4, 2021	MF	(United States) Daniel Crisostomo	(United States) Las Vegas Lights	Affiliate club signing	
August 6, 2021	DF	(United States) Sebastien Ibeagha	(United States) New York City FC	Trade	
August 19, 2021	DF	(United States) Julian Gaines	(United States) Las Vegas Lights	Affiliate club signing	
September 13, 2021	GK	(England) Jamal Blackman	(England) Chelsea	Free Agent	
September 21, 2021	FW	(Democratic Republic of the Congo) Michee Ngalina	(United States) Colorado Springs Switchbacks	Loan	

=== Transfers out ===
Exit date	Position	Player	To club	Notes	Ref.
December 1, 2020	GK	(United States) Philip Ejimadu	(United States) Las Vegas Lights	declined contract options	
December 1, 2020	DF	(Honduras) Andy Najar	(United States) D.C. United	declined contract options	
December 1, 2020	DF	(Canada) Dejan Jaković	(Canada) Forge FC	Free agent	
December 1, 2020	DF	(Libya) Mohamed El-Munir	Free agent	Free agent	
December 22, 2020	FW	(United States) Adrien Perez	(United States) D.C. United	Re-Entry Draft	
December 23, 2020	FW	(England) Bradley Wright-Phillips	(United States) Columbus Crew SC	Free agent	
February 1, 2021	FW	(Uruguay) Brian Rodríguez	(Spain) UD Almería	Loan	
March 4, 2021	MF	(United States) Alejandro Guido	(United States) San Diego Loyal SC	Released	
April 16, 2021	GK	(Netherlands) Kenneth Vermeer	(United States) FC Cincinnati	Mutually agreed to part ways	
July 27, 2021	MF	(Canada) Mark-Anthony Kaye	(United States) Colorado Rapids	Trade	
July 30, 2021	FW	(United States) Corey Baird	(United States) Houston Dynamo FC	Trade	
September 1, 2021	FW	(Uruguay) Diego Rossi	(Turkey) Fenerbahçe	Loan	

=== Draft picks ===
Round	#	Position	Player	College/Club Team	Reference
1		FW	(Mexico) Daniel Trejo	CSU Northridge/Los Angeles Force	
2		DF	(United States) CC Uche	Ohio State University	
3		FW	(United States) Alvaro Quezada	University of California, Irvine	

== Competitions ==
Win Draw Loss

=== Preseason friendlies ===
April 3 Preseason 1	Los Angeles FC	2–2	New England Revolution	Los Angeles
11:00 AM PT	Atuesta 63'; Rossi 90'	LAFC Report; NE Report	Bou 46'; Buksa 49'	Stadium: Banc of California Stadium; Attendance: 0
Note: Match was played behind closed doors

April 10 Preseason 2	Los Angeles FC	3–3	New England Revolution	Los Angeles
	Rossi 14'; Vela 58'; Segura 84'		Buksa 2'; Polster 7'; Gil 61' (pen.)	Stadium: Banc of California Stadium; Attendance: 0
Note: Match was played behind closed doors

=== MLS ===
==== Standings ====
===== Western Conference =====
Pos	Team	Pld	W	L	T	GF	GA	GD	Pts	
7	Real Salt Lake	34	14	14	6	55	54	+1	48	Qualification for the first round
8	LA Galaxy	34	13	12	9	50	54	−4	48	
9	Los Angeles FC	34	12	13	9	53	51	+2	45	
10	San Jose Earthquakes	34	10	13	11	46	54	−8	41	
11	FC Dallas	34	7	15	12	47	56	−9	33	

Source: MLS
Rules for classification: 1) points; 2) total wins; 3) total goal differential; 4) total goals scored; 5) fewer disciplinary points; 6) away goal differential; 7) away goals scored; 8) home goals differential; 9) home goals scored; 10) coin toss (2 clubs tied) or drawing of lots (≥3 clubs tied)

===== Overall =====
Pos	Team	Pld	W	L	T	GF	GA	GD	Pts	
17	Columbus Crew	34	13	13	8	46	45	+1	47	
18	CF Montréal (V)	34	12	12	10	46	44	+2	46	Qualification for the CONCACAF Champions League (Note: As 2021 Canadian Championship winners (CAN1))
19	Los Angeles FC	34	12	13	9	53	51	+2	45	
20	Inter Miami CF	34	12	17	5	36	53	−17	41	
21	San Jose Earthquakes	34	10	13	11	46	54	−8	41	

Source: MLS
Rules for classification: 1) points; 2) total wins; 3) total goal differential; 4) total goals scored; 5) fewer disciplinary points; 6) away goal differential; 7) away goals scored; 8) home goals differential; 9) home goals scored; 10) coin toss (2 clubs tied) or drawing of lots (≥3 clubs tied)
(V) Canadian Championship winners

==== Matches ====
All matches are in Pacific time

April 17 1	Los Angeles FC	2–0	Austin FC	Los Angeles
2:30 PM PT	Baird 61'; Cifuentes 90+1'	Report		Stadium: Banc of California Stadium; Attendance: 4,900; Referee: Alex Chilowicz

April 24 2	Los Angeles FC	1–1	Seattle Sounders FC	Los Angeles
3:00 PM PT	Atuesta 2'; Blessing (yellow card) 88'	Report	Smith 54'; Arreaga (yellow card) 78'; Dobbelaere (yellow card) 83'; A. Roldan (yellow card) 85'	Stadium: Banc of California Stadium; Attendance: 4,900; Referee: Armando Villarreal

May 1 3	Houston Dynamo FC	1–1	Los Angeles FC	Houston, Texas
12:30 PM PT	Pasher 57'	Report	Murillo (yellow card) 29'; Baird 55'	Stadium: BBVA Stadium; Attendance: 7,850; Referee: Robert Sibiga

May 8 4	LA Galaxy	2–1	Los Angeles FC	Carson, California
5:00 PM PT	Hernández 11', (yellow card) 44'; Villafaña (yellow card) 20'; Saldana (yellow card) 42' dos Santos 79', (yellow card) 79'; Harvey (yellow card) 83'; Araujo (yellow card) 90+2'	Report	Rossi 62'; Blackmon (yellow card) 82'	Stadium: Dignity Health Sports Park; Attendance: 7,193; Referee: Allen Chapman

May 16 5	Seattle Sounders FC	2–0	Los Angeles FC	Seattle, Washington
6:30 PM PT	Paulo (yellow card) 45'; Andrade (yellow card) 52'; Arreaga 57'; Smith 73'	Report	Murillo (yellow card) 78'	Stadium: Lumen Field; Attendance: 7,173; Referee: Joe Dickerson

May 22 6	Los Angeles FC	2–1	Colorado Rapids	Los Angeles
7:30 PM PT	Rossi 14', 33'; Cifuentes (yellow card) 60'	Report	Barrios 50'; Rubio (yellow card) 69'	Stadium: Banc of California Stadium; Attendance: 10,483; Referee: Ismail Elfath

May 29 7	Los Angeles FC	1–2	New York City FC	Los Angeles
3:00 PM PT	Atuesta (yellow card) 48'; Baird 56'	Report	Medina (yellow card) 53', (goal) 70'; Acevedo (yellow card) 86' (yellow-red card) 86'; Tajouri-Shradi 90'	Stadium: Banc of California Stadium; Attendance: 10,703; Referee: Kevin Stott

June 19 8	Los Angeles FC	1–1	Houston Dynamo FC	Los Angeles
8:00 PM PT	Cifuentes 50'	Report	Parker (yellow card) 17'; Vera (yellow card) 30'; Urruti 58'; Picault (yellow card) 71'	Stadium: Banc of California Stadium; Attendance: 22,043; Referee: Joseph Dickerson

June 23 9	Los Angeles FC	2–0	FC Dallas	Los Angeles
7:30 PM PT	Vela 4'; Blessing 69'; Murillo (yellow card) 90'	Report	Bressan (yellow card) 60'; Vargas (yellow card) 80'; Ricaurte (yellow card) 84'	Stadium: Banc of California Stadium; Attendance: 22,510; Referee: Rosendo Mendoza

June 26 10	Sporting Kansas City	2–1	Los Angeles FC	Kansas City, Kansas
2:00 PM PT	Ilie (yellow card) 44'; Pulido 61'; Sallói 87'	Report	Blackmon (yellow card) 12' (yellow-red card) 58'; Moon-hwan 24'; Romero (yellow card) 64'	Stadium: Children's Mercy Park; Attendance: 20,213; Referee: Chris Penso

July 3 11	Real Salt Lake	0–1	Los Angeles FC	Sandy, Utah
7:00 PM PT	Brody (yellow card) 17'; Kreilach (yellow card) 75'; Glad (yellow card) 83'	Report	Baird (yellow card) 61'; Cifuentes 69'; Rossi (yellow card) 90+6'	Stadium: Rio Tinto Stadium; Attendance: 18,253; Referee: Silviu Petrescu

July 7 12	Austin FC	0–2	Los Angeles FC	Austin, Texas
6:00 PM PT	Pereira (yellow card) 3'; Cascante (yellow card) 36'; Kolmanič (yellow card) 45+2'	Report	Cifuentes 39'; Farfan (yellow card) 70'; Murillo (yellow card) 85'; Rossi 89'	Stadium: Q2 Stadium; Attendance: 20,738; Referee: Ramy Touchan

July 17 13	Los Angeles FC	2–1	Real Salt Lake	Los Angeles
7:30 PM PT	Rossi 10'; Murillo (yellow card) 62'; Vela 79'	Report	Herrera 18', (yellow card) 77'; Everton (yellow card) 45+1'; Kreilach (yellow card) 50'; Besler (yellow card) 87'	Stadium: Banc of California Stadium; Attendance: 22,490; Referee: Robert Sibiga

July 21 14	Portland Timbers	2–1	Los Angeles FC	Portland, Oregon
7:30 PM PT	Valeri 2'; Paredes (yellow card) 86'; Mora 90+3'	Report	Vela 17'	Stadium: Providence Park; Attendance: 23,500; Referee: Victor Rivas

July 24 15	Los Angeles FC	2–2	Vancouver Whitecaps FC	Los Angeles
7:30 PM PT	Vela 42'; Baird (yellow card) 67'; Cifuentes 75'; Murillo (yellow card) 82'	Report	Caicedo 25', (yellow card) 84'; Alexandre (yellow card) 27'; Dájome 38'; Baldisimo (yellow card) 58'; Bikel (yellow card) 69'	Stadium: Banc of California Stadium; Attendance: 22,049; Referee: Kevin Stott

July 28 16	Los Angeles FC	2–2	Minnesota United FC	Los Angeles
7:30 PM PT	Vela 40'; Blackmon 77'	Report	Reynoso 49'; Dibassy (yellow card) 59'; Trapp (yellow card) 67'; Dotson 90+5'	Stadium: Banc of California Stadium; Attendance: 22,118; Referee: Baldomero Toledo

August 4 17	Los Angeles FC	1–4	Sporting Kansas City	Los Angeles
7:30 PM PT	Romero (yellow card) 20'; Cifuentes (yellow card) 33'; Ginella (yellow card) 62'; Musovski 82'; Duke (yellow card) 85'; Atuesta (yellow card) 90+7'	Report	Pulido 20'; Isimat-Mirin (yellow card) 25'; Martins 28'; Sallói 36'; Zusi (yellow card) 41'; Sánchez (yellow card) 57'; Kinda 58'; Fontàs (yellow card) 90+2'; Espinoza (yellow card) 90+6'	Stadium: Banc of California Stadium; Attendance: 22,114; Referee: Alan Kelly

August 8 18	San Jose Earthquakes	2–1	Los Angeles FC	San Jose, California
4:00 PM PT	Nathan 11'; López 28'; Cowell (yellow card) 39'; Ebobisse (yellow card) 76'	Report	Murillo (yellow card) 10'; Yueill 39' (o.g.); Rossi (yellow card) 78'	Stadium: Earthquakes Stadium; Attendance: 18,000; Referee: Rubiel Vazquez

August 15 19	Atlanta United FC	1–0	Los Angeles FC	Atlanta, Georgia
1:00 PM PT	Martínez 46'; Bello (yellow card) 85'	Report	Atuesta (yellow card) 90+6'	Stadium: Mercedes-Benz Stadium; Attendance: 67,503; Referee: Chris Penso

August 21 20	Vancouver Whitecaps FC	2–1	Los Angeles FC	Vancouver, British Columbia
7:00 PM PT	White 60'; Gauld 89'	Report	Rossi 45+2' (pen.); Arango (yellow card) 90+4'	Stadium: BC Place; Attendance: Not reported Referee: Alex Chilowicz

August 28 21	Los Angeles FC	3–3	LA Galaxy	Los Angeles
4:00 PM PT	Cifuentes (yellow card) 14'; Arango 44' (pen.); Rodríguez 58', 67'	Report	Joveljić 20', 64', (yellow card) 64'; Dos Santos (yellow card) 35'; Coulibaly (yellow card) 76'; Cabral 86', (yellow card) 87'	Stadium: Banc of California Stadium; Attendance: 22,032; Referee: Allen Chapman

September 3 22	Los Angeles FC	4–0	Sporting Kansas City	Los Angeles
7:00 PM PT	Fall 18', 61'; Ibeagha (yellow card) 41'; Arango 71'; Duke (yellow card) 77'; Musovski (yellow card) 79'; Atuesta 87' (pen.)	Report	Espinoza (red card) 58'; Melia (yellow card) 85'	Stadium: Banc of California Stadium; Attendance: 22,018; Referee: Drew Fischer

September 12 23	Los Angeles FC	3–2	Real Salt Lake	Los Angeles
7:30 PM PT	Arango 1', 30'; Edwards (yellow card) 23'; Duke (yellow card) 57'; Datković 59' (o.g.); Ibeagha (yellow card) 90+3'	Report	Datković (yellow card) 22'; Kreilach 28'; Everton (yellow card) 45+1'; Julio 48'	Stadium: Banc of California Stadium; Attendance: 22,130; Referee: Ted Unkel

September 15 24	Austin FC	1–2	Los Angeles FC	Austin, Texas
6:00 PM PT	Stroud (yellow card) 35'; Cascante (yellow card) 64'; Fagúndez 67'	Report	Crisostomo (yellow card) 29'; Arango 59' (pen.); Musovski (yellow card) 79', (goal) 81'	Stadium: Q2 Stadium; Attendance: 20,738; Referee: Timothy Ford

September 19 25	Portland Timbers	2–1	Los Angeles FC	Portland, Oregon
3:00 PM PT	Asprilla 21'; Mabiala (yellow card) 24'; Blanco (yellow card) 26'; Bravo (yellow card) 42'; Fochive 68'; Valeri (yellow card) 83'	Report	Arango 27' (pen.)	Stadium: Providence Park; Attendance: 21,311; Referee: Chris Penso

September 25 26	San Jose Earthquakes	2–0	Los Angeles FC	San Jose, California
7:00 PM PT	Kikanovic 3'; Nathan (yellow card) 31'; Espinoza (yellow card) 34'; E. López 47'; Abecasis (yellow card) 64'; M. López (yellow card) 86'	Report	Crisostomo (yellow card) 39'; Cifuentes (yellow card) 75'	Stadium: Earthquakes Stadium; Attendance: 16,927; Referee: Jair Marrufo

September 29 27	Los Angeles FC	1–2	Portland Timbers	Los Angeles
7:00 PM PT	Palacios (yellow card) 29'; Musovski 55'; Arango (yellow card) 90+9'	Report	Paredes (yellow card) 25'; Y. Chará 45'; Asprilla (yellow card) 45+2', (goal) 59'; Valeri (yellow card) 76'	Stadium: Banc of California Stadium; Attendance: 22,056; Referee: Joseph Dickerson

October 3 28	LA Galaxy	1–1	Los Angeles FC	Carson, California
5:00 PM PT	Araujo (yellow card) 10'; Grandsir (yellow card) 18', (goal) 19'; Depuy (yellow card) 30'	Report	Fall 11'; Edwards (yellow card) 22'; Crisostomo (yellow card) 44'	Stadium: Dignity Health Sports Park; Attendance: 25,174; Referee: Armando Villarreal

October 16 29	Los Angeles FC	3–1	San Jose Earthquakes	Los Angeles
12:30 PM PT	Musovski 3'; Arango 28' (pen.), 88', (yellow card) 86'; Murillo (yellow card) 81'; Farfan (yellow card) 90+3'	Report	Marcinkowski (yellow card) 28'; López (yellow card) 40'; Fierro 61'; Judson (yellow card) 90+9'	Stadium: Banc of California Stadium; Attendance: 22,003; Referee: Alan Kelly

October 20 30	FC Dallas	2–3	Los Angeles FC	Frisco, Texas
5:00 PM PT	Hollingshead 10', (yellow card) 72'; Jara 45'; Hedges (yellow card) 59'	Report	Arango 33' (pen.), 75', 79'; Cifuentes (yellow card) 67'; Musovski (yellow card) 89'	Stadium: Toyota Stadium; Attendance: 12,532; Referee: Chris Penso

October 23 31	Minnesota United FC	1–1	Los Angeles FC	Saint Paul, Minnesota
5:00 PM PT	Trapp (yellow card) 32'; Gasper (yellow card) 56'; Alonso 65'; Dibassy (yellow card) 88'	Report	Arango 32'; Murillo (yellow card) 63'; Cifuentes (yellow card) 74'	Stadium: Allianz Field; Attendance: 19,406; Referee: Robert Sibiga

October 26 32	Los Angeles FC	3–0	Seattle Sounders FC	Los Angeles
7:30 PM PT	Rodríguez 21'; Blessing 45+3'; Arango 51', (yellow card) 70'; Palacios (yellow card) 79'; Fall (yellow card) 90+4'	Report	Nouhou (yellow card) 66'	Stadium: Banc of California Stadium; Attendance: 22,030; Referee: Kevin Stott

November 2 33	Los Angeles FC	1–1	Vancouver Whitecaps FC	Los Angeles
7:30 PM PT	Fall 45+2'; Rodríguez (yellow card) 79'	Report	Dájome 14'; Teibert (yellow card) 79'	Stadium: Banc of California Stadium; Attendance: 22,221; Referee: Alex Chilowicz

November 7 34	Colorado Rapids	5–2	Los Angeles FC	Commerce City, Colorado
3:00 PM PT	Price (yellow card) 15'; Lewis 18', 53'; Warner 33'; Bassett 63'; Wilson (yellow card) 72'; Badji 79'	Report	Arango 55'; Rodríguez 71'; Edwards (yellow card) 83'	Stadium: Dick's Sporting Goods Park; Attendance: 16,292; Referee: Allen Chapman
