= Mamadou Fall =

Mamadou Fall may refer to:

- Mamadou Fall (footballer, born 1991), Senegalese football midfielder for Kasımpaşa
- Mamadou Fall (footballer, born 2002), Senegalese football centre-back for Barcelona Atlètic
- Mamadou Fall (footballer, born 2005), Senegalese football defender for OFK Beograd
