= Jesús David Murillo =

Colombian footballer (born 1994)

Jesús Murillo
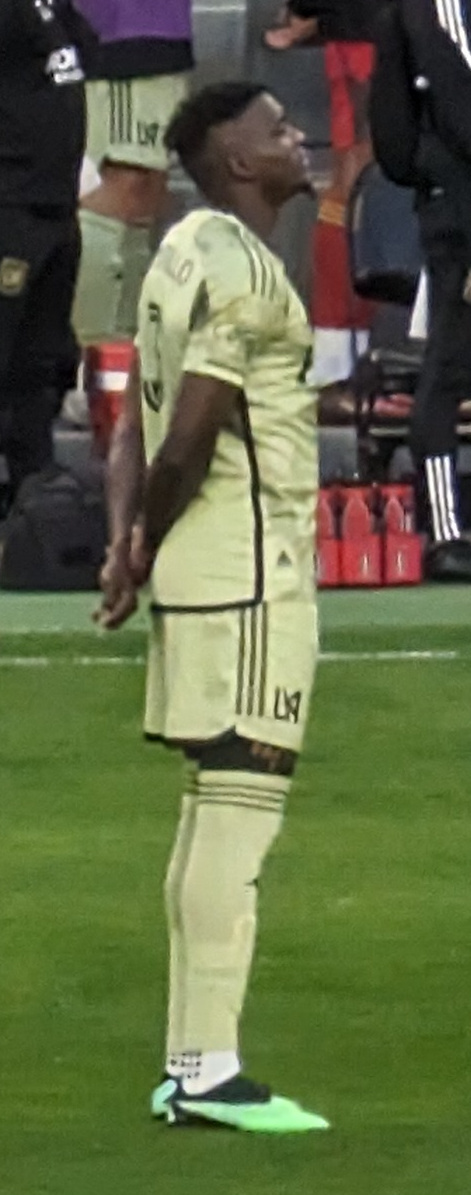

Personal information
- Full name: Jesús David Murillo Largacha
- Date of birth: 18 February 1994 (age 32)
- Place of birth: Cali, Colombia
- Height: 1.89 m (6 ft 2 in)
- Position: Defender

Team information
- Current team: Juárez
- Number: 3

Youth career
- Independiente Medellín

Senior career*
Years	Team	Apps	(Gls)
2013–2014	Deportivo Pasto	19	(0)
2015–2017	Patriotas Boyacá	92	(1)
2018–2021	Independiente Medellín	90	(4)
2020	→ Los Angeles FC (loan)	5	(0)
2021–2024	Los Angeles FC	113	(4)
2025–	Juárez	10	(1)
- * Club domestic league appearances and goals as of 29 March 2025

Jesús David Murillo Largacha (born 18 February 1994) is a Colombian professional footballer who plays for Liga MX club Juárez.

== Career ==
Born in Cali, Colombia, Murillo began his career with Categoría Primera A club Independiente Medellín, making his professional debut on 13 April 2012 in the Copa Colombia against Atlético Nacional. He started and played whole first half before being substituted as Independiente Medellín were defeated 2–1. A year later, Murillo moved to Deportivo Pasto and made his league debut on 4 August 2013 against Patriotas Boyacá. He was a starter in the 1–1 draw.

In 2015, Murillo joined Patriotas Boyacá and made his debut on 7 February 2015 against Millonarios. He was a starter as Patriotas were defeated 2–0. On 6 April 2017, Murillo made his international club debut in the Copa Sudamericana against Everton. He then scored his first professional goal on 3 August 2017 in a Copa Colombia match against Unión Magdalena. His 80th-minute goal was enough to give Patriotas a 1–0 victory.

In 2018, Murillo left Patriotas Boyacá and re-joined Independiente Medellín, making his debut on 3 February 2018 against Atlético Huila. His scored his first goal for the club in his second match on February 11 against Boyacá Chicó in a 2–1 victory. A year later, on 7 February 2019, Murillo made his debut in the Copa Libertadores against Palestino. On 13 February, during the return leg, Murillo scored the equalizer against Palestino that would eventually lead to penalties which Independiente lost 4–1.

In November 2019, Murillo started in both matches for Independiente Medellín against Deportivo Cali in the finals of the 2019 Copa Colombia. Medellín won the title 4–3 in aggregate, drawing the first leg 2–2 and then winning the second leg 2–1.

On 14 October 2020, Murillo joined Major League Soccer club Los Angeles FC on loan for the remainder of the 2020 season. On 22 January 2021, Murillo signed with Los Angeles FC on a permanent transfer from Independiente Medellín. On 27 November 2024, Los Angeles FC announced that Murillo's contract with the club had ended and that the club were in talks to retain him.

On 27 December 2024, Liga MX club FC Juárez announced they had signed Murillo to the club for the 2025 season.

== Career statistics ==
=== Club ===
As of match played on 5 April 2022

Appearances and goals by club, season and competition
Club	Season	League			Cup		Other		Total	
Club	Season	Division	Apps	Goals	Apps	Goals	Apps	Goals	Apps	Goals
Independiente Medellín	2012	Categoría Primera A	0	0	1	0	—		1	0
Deportivo Pasto	2013	Categoría Primera A	5	0	2	0	—		7	0
Deportivo Pasto	2014	Categoría Primera A	14	0	2	0	—		16	0
Deportivo Pasto	Total		19	0	6	0	—		25	0
Patriotas Boyacá	2015	Categoría Primera A	26	0	6	0	—		32	0
Patriotas Boyacá	2016	Categoría Primera A	37	0	8	0	2	0	47	0
Patriotas Boyacá	2017	Categoría Primera A	26	1	7	1	3	0	36	2
Patriotas Boyacá	Total		92	1	22	1	3	0	117	2
Independiente Medellín	2018	Categoría Primera A	35	2	2	0	11	0	46	2
Independiente Medellín	2019	Categoría Primera A	37	2	8	1	2	1	47	4
Independiente Medellín	2020	Categoría Primera A	9	0	0	0	9	2	18	2
Independiente Medellín	Total		90	4	10	1	13	3	113	8
Los Angeles FC (loan)	2020	Major League Soccer	5	0	1	0	3	0	9	0
Los Angeles FC	2021	Major League Soccer	32	0	—		—		32	0
Los Angeles FC	2022	Major League Soccer	29	2	1	0	4	1	34	3
Los Angeles FC	2023	Major League Soccer	19	0	0	0	14	1	33	1
Los Angeles FC	2024	Major League Soccer	22	0	2	0	10	0	34	0
Career total			242	6	40	2	19	3	397	14

== Honours ==
Independiente Medellín

- Copa Colombia: 2019

Los Angeles FC

- MLS Cup: 2022
- Supporters' Shield: 2022
- U.S. Open Cup: 2024

Individual

- CONCACAF Champions League Team of the tournament: 2020
- MLS All-Star: 2021
