= Diego Palacios =

Ecuadorian footballer (born 1999)

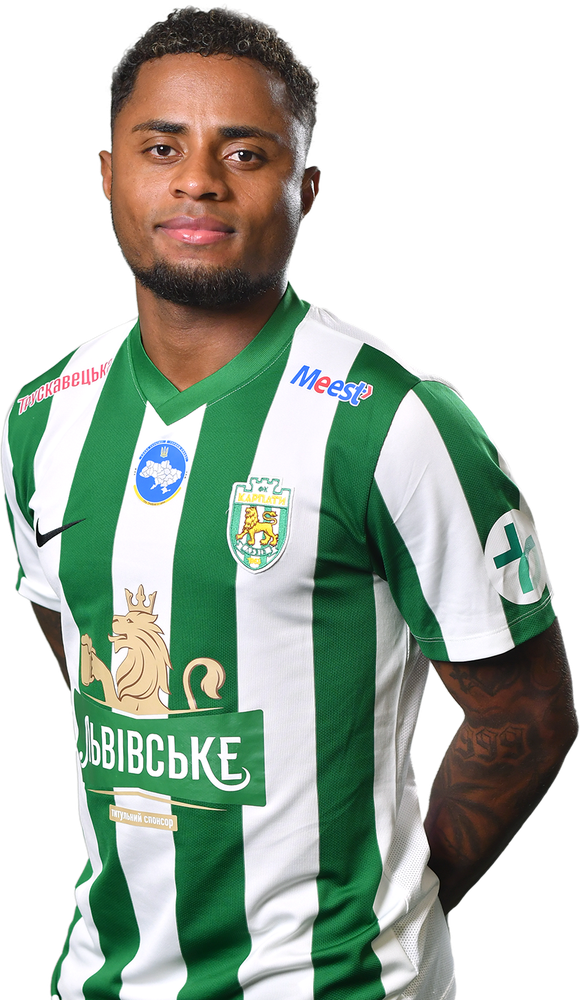

Personal information
- Full name: Diego José Palacios Espinoza
- Date of birth: 12 July 1999 (age 27)
- Place of birth: Guayaquil, Ecuador
- Height: 1.69 m (5 ft 7 in)
- Position: Left-back

Team information
- Current team: Universidad Católica (on loan from Corinthians)
- Number: 6

Youth career
- 2011–2014: Norte América
- 2014: Deportivo Azogues
- 2015: Norte América
- 2016: Aucas

Senior career*
Years	Team	Apps	(Gls)
2014	Deportivo Azogues	1	(0)
2015	Norte América	6	(0)
2016–2019	Aucas	63	(2)
2018–2019	→ Willem II (loan)	27	(0)
2019–2023	Los Angeles FC	104	(1)
2024–	Corinthians	4	(0)
2025–2026	→ Karpaty Lviv (loan)	1	(0)
2026–	→ Universidad Católica (loan)	10	(0)

International career^{‡}
- Ecuador U20
2018–	Ecuador	12	(0)
Medal record
Men's football
Representing Ecuador
FIFA U-20 World Cup
Third place	2019 Poland
- * Club domestic league appearances and goals as of 15 July 2026 ‡ National team caps and goals as of 6 January 2023

Diego José Palacios Espinoza (born 12 July 1999), commonly known as "Chiqui", is an Ecuadorian professional footballer who plays as a left-back for Universidad Católica on loan from Corinthians and the Ecuador national team.

During the 2020 CONCACAF Champions Cup, he won the award for Best Young Player.

== Club career ==
=== Early career ===
Born in Guayaquil, Palacios made his senior debut with Deportivo Azogues in the 2014 Segunda Categoría. After a short period at Norte América, he moved to Aucas in 2016 after both clubs had a partnership.

Palacios spent a season with the youth sides before making his first team debut for Aucas in 2017, in the Ecuadorian Serie B. A regular starter, he helped the club in their promotion to the Ecuadorian Serie A, and made his debut in the category in 2018.

=== Willem II ===
In July 2018 he agreed a season long loan with Willem II. He made his debut in the Dutch Eredivisie on 11 August 2018 playing the full 90 minutes against VVV-Venlo.

=== Los Angeles FC ===
On 12 August 2019, Palacios signed a contract with Major League Soccer side Los Angeles FC.

=== Corinthians ===
On 2 January 2024, Palacios was announced at Corinthians.

== International career ==
In October 2018 he made his debut for the Ecuador national team in a friendly game against the Qatar national team.

Palacios was selected in the 28 player Ecuador squad for the 2021 Copa América.

Palacios was named in the Ecuadorian squad for the 2022 FIFA World Cup.

== Career statistics ==
=== Career statistics ===
As of match played 5 July 2026

Appearances and goals by club, season and competition
Club	Season	League			Cup		Continental		Other		Total	
Club	Season	Division	Apps	Goals	Apps	Goals	Apps	Goals	Apps	Goals	Apps	Goals
Deportivo Azogues	2014	Segunda Categoría	1	0	—		—		—		1	0
Norte América	2015	Segunda Categoría	6	0	—		—		10 (Note: Appearance(s) in Campeonato Provincial de Segunda Categoría de Guayas)	0	16	0
Aucas	2016	Ecuadorian Serie A	0	0	—		—		—		0	0
Aucas	2017	Ecuadorian Serie B	40	1	—		—		—		40	1
Aucas	2018	Ecuadorian Serie A	23	1	—		—		—		23	1
Aucas	Total		63	2	—		—		—		63	2
Willem II (loan)	2018–19	Eredivisie	27	0	5	0	—		—		32	0
Los Angeles FC	2019	Major League Soccer	2	0	0	0	—		—		2	0
Los Angeles FC	2020	Major League Soccer	18	0	—		5 (Note: Appearance(s) in CONCACAF Champions League)	0	—		23	0
Los Angeles FC	2021	Major League Soccer	27	0	—		—		—		27	0
Los Angeles FC	2022	Major League Soccer	28	1	3	0	—		3 (Note: Appearance(s) in MLS Cup Playoffs)	0	34	1
Los Angeles FC	2023	Major League Soccer	29	0	—		8	0	8 (Note: Two appearances in Leagues Cup, one appearance in Campeones Cup, five appearances in MLS Cup Playoffs)	0	45	0
Los Angeles FC	Total		104	1	3	0	13	0	11	0	131	1
Corinthians	2024	Série A	—		—		—		1 (Note: Appearance in Campeonato Paulista)	0	1	0
Corinthians	2025	Série A	—		—		—		3	0	3	0
Corinthians	Total		—		—		—		4	0	4	0
Karpaty Lviv (loan)	2025	Ukrainian Premier League	1	0	—		—		—		1	0
C.D. Universidad Católica (loan)	2026	Ecuadorian Serie A	10	0	—		1 (Note: Appearance in Copa Libertadores)	0	—		11	0
Career total			212	3	8	0	14	0	25	0	259	3

=== International ===
As of 12 November 2022

Ecuador
Year	Apps	Goals
2018	1	0
2019	4	0
2020	1	0
2021	4	0
2022	2	0
Total	12	0

== Honours ==
Los Angeles FC

- MLS Cup: 2022
- Supporters' Shield: 2022
- CONCACAF Champions League runner-up: 2020

Ecuador U20

- U-20 South American Championship: 2019
- FIFA U-20 World Cup third place: 2019

Corinthians

- Campeonato Paulista: 2025

Individual

- South American Youth Championship Team of the Tournament: 2019
- CONCACAF Champions League Best Young Player: 2020
- CONCACAF Champions League Team of the Tournament: 2020, 2023
- MLS All-Star: 2022
