= Kim Moon-hwan =

South Korean footballer (born 1995)

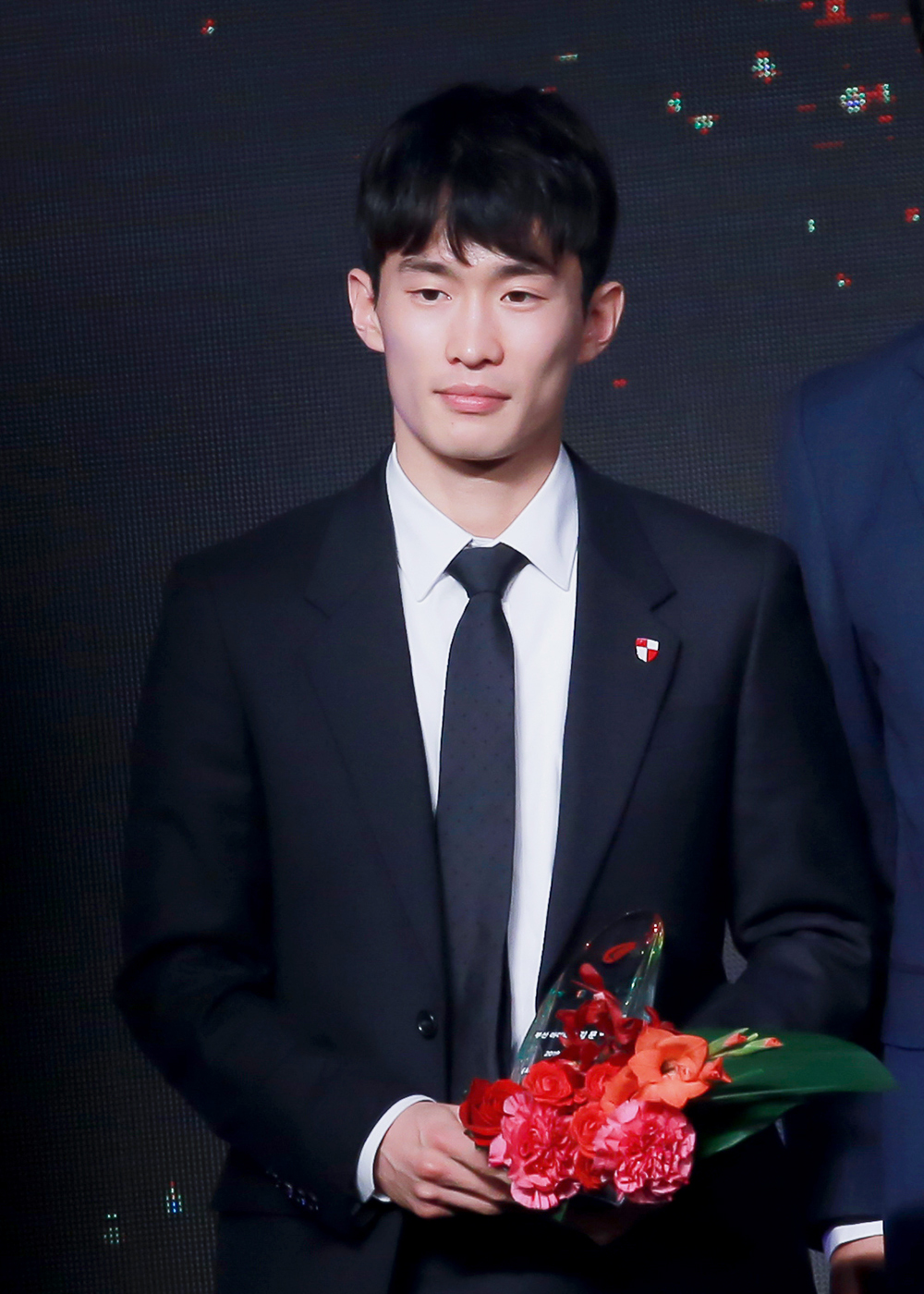
- Kim in 2019

Personal information
- Full name: Kim Moon-hwan
- Date of birth: 1 August 1995 (age 31)
- Place of birth: Hwaseong, South Korea
- Height: 1.73 m (5 ft 8 in)
- Position: Right-back

Team information
- Current team: Daejeon Hana Citizen
- Number: 33

Youth career
- 2011–2013: Suwon High School

College career
Years	Team	Apps	(Gls)
2014–2016	Chung-Ang University		

Senior career*
Years	Team	Apps	(Gls)
2017–2020	Busan IPark	102	(8)
2021–2022	Los Angeles FC	28	(1)
2022–2023	Jeonbuk Hyundai Motors	39	(1)
2023–2024	Al-Duhail	18	(0)
2024–	Daejeon Hana Citizen	68	(0)

International career^{‡}
2018	South Korea U23	12	(0)
2018–	South Korea	36	(0)
Medal record
Men's football
Representing South Korea
Asian Games
Gold medal – first place	2018 Jakarta-Palembang
EAFF Championship
Winner	2019 South Korea
Runner-up	2022 Japan
Runner-up	2025 South Korea
- * Club domestic league appearances and goals as of 8 November 2026 ‡ National team caps and goals as of 18 June 2026

- Kim Moon-hwan
- Hangul: 김문환
- Hanja: 金紋奐
- RR: Gim Munhwan
- MR: Kim Munhwan
- IPA: [kim.mun.ɦwan]

Kim Moon-hwan (Korean: 김문환; born 1 August 1995) is a South Korean professional footballer who plays as a right-back for K League 1 club Daejeon Hana Citizen and the South Korea national team.

== Club career ==
After attending Chung-Ang University for three years, Kim signed for K League 2 club Busan IPark on 3 January 2017. He played as a forward until his university days, whereas starting to play as a right-back at Busan. In his first professional season, the club reached the finals at both the promotion play-offs and the Korean FA Cup, but lost the two finals.

In 2018 and 2019, Kim was evaluated as the best right-back of the K League 2, being named in the league's Best XI. He became a K League 1 player in 2020 after helping Busan win the promotion play-offs.

After Busan finished bottom of the K League 1, Kim joined Major League Soccer club Los Angeles FC on 11 January 2021. He played four matches as a substitute during LAFC's first eight matches due to an aftereffect of knee injury. On 24 June, he made his first MLS start in a 2–0 win over FC Dallas, where he was named the Man of the Match. He made 28 appearances including 20 starts for about a year at LAFC.

On 18 March 2022, Kim transferred to K League 1 side Jeonbuk Hyundai Motors. He judged that playing for Jeonbuk was more likely to be selected for the South Korean squad for the 2022 FIFA World Cup. After winning the 2022 Korean FA Cup with Jeonbuk, he was called up to the national team for the World Cup.

== International career ==
Kim played for the South Korea under-23 team at both the 2018 AFC U-23 Championship and the 2018 Asian Games. Kim and his teammates won a gold at the latter, earning their exemption from military service.

On 7 September 2018, Kim made his senior international debut as a substitute in a 2–0 win over Costa Rica. On 16 January 2019, he played as a starter for the national team for the first time in an AFC Asian Cup match against China, which ended in a 2–0 win.

At the 2022 FIFA World Cup, Kim played all 360 minutes for South Korea until the round of 16.

He received a call-up by Myung-Bo Hong to join the South Korea's squad for the 2026 FIFA World Cup.

== Career statistics ==
=== Club ===
As of match played 8 November 2026

Club	Season	League			National cup (Note: Includes Korean FA Cup)		Continental		Other		Total	
Club	Season	Division	Apps	Goals	Apps	Goals	Apps	Goals	Apps	Goals	Apps	Goals
Busan IPark	2017	K League 2	29	4	7	0	—		3 (Note: Appearances in K League 2 promotion play-offs)	0	39	4
Busan IPark	2018	K League 2	23	3	1	1	—		3	0	27	4
Busan IPark	2019	K League 2	26	0	0	0	—		3	0	29	0
Busan IPark	2020	K League 1	24	1	1	0	—		—		25	1
Busan IPark	Total		102	8	9	1	—		9	0	120	9
Los Angeles FC	2021	Major League Soccer	27	1	0	0	—		—		27	1
Los Angeles FC	2022	Major League Soccer	1	0	0	0	—		—		1	0
Los Angeles FC	Total		28	1	0	0	—		—		28	1
Jeonbuk Hyundai Motors	2022	K League 1	28	1	5	0	6 (Note: Appearances in AFC Champions League Elite)	0	—		39	1
Jeonbuk Hyundai Motors	2023	K League 1	11	0	1	0	0	0	—		12	0
Jeonbuk Hyundai Motors	Total		39	1	6	0	6	0	—		51	1
Al-Duhail	2023–24	Qatar Stars League	18	0	0	0	6	0	2 (Note: Appearances in Qatari Stars Cup)	0	26	0
Daejeon Hana Citizen	2024	K League 1	15	0	—		—		—		15	0
Daejeon Hana Citizen	2025	K League 1	24	0	2	0	—		—		26	0
Daejeon Hana Citizen	2026	K League 1	29	0	1	0	1	0	1 (Note: Appearance in K League Super Cup)	0	32	0
Daejeon Hana Citizen	Total		68	0	3	0	1	0	1	0	73	0
Career total			255	10	18	1	13	0	12	0	298	11

=== International ===
As of match played 18 June 2026

Appearances and goals by national team and year
National team	Year	Apps	Goals
South Korea	2018	4	0
South Korea	2019	7	0
South Korea	2021	3	0
South Korea	2022	12	0
South Korea	2023	0	0
South Korea	2024	2	0
South Korea	2025	5	0
South Korea	2026	3	0
Total		36	0

== Honours ==
Busan IPark

- Korean FA Cup runner-up: 2017

Jeonbuk Hyundai Motors

- Korean FA Cup: 2022

South Korea U23

- Asian Games: 2018

South Korea

- EAFF Championship: 2019

Individual

- K League 2 Best XI: 2018, 2019
- K League 1 Best XI: 2025
- EAFF Championship Best Defender: 2025
- K League All-Star: 2026
