= José Cifuentes =

Ecuadorian footballer (born 1999)

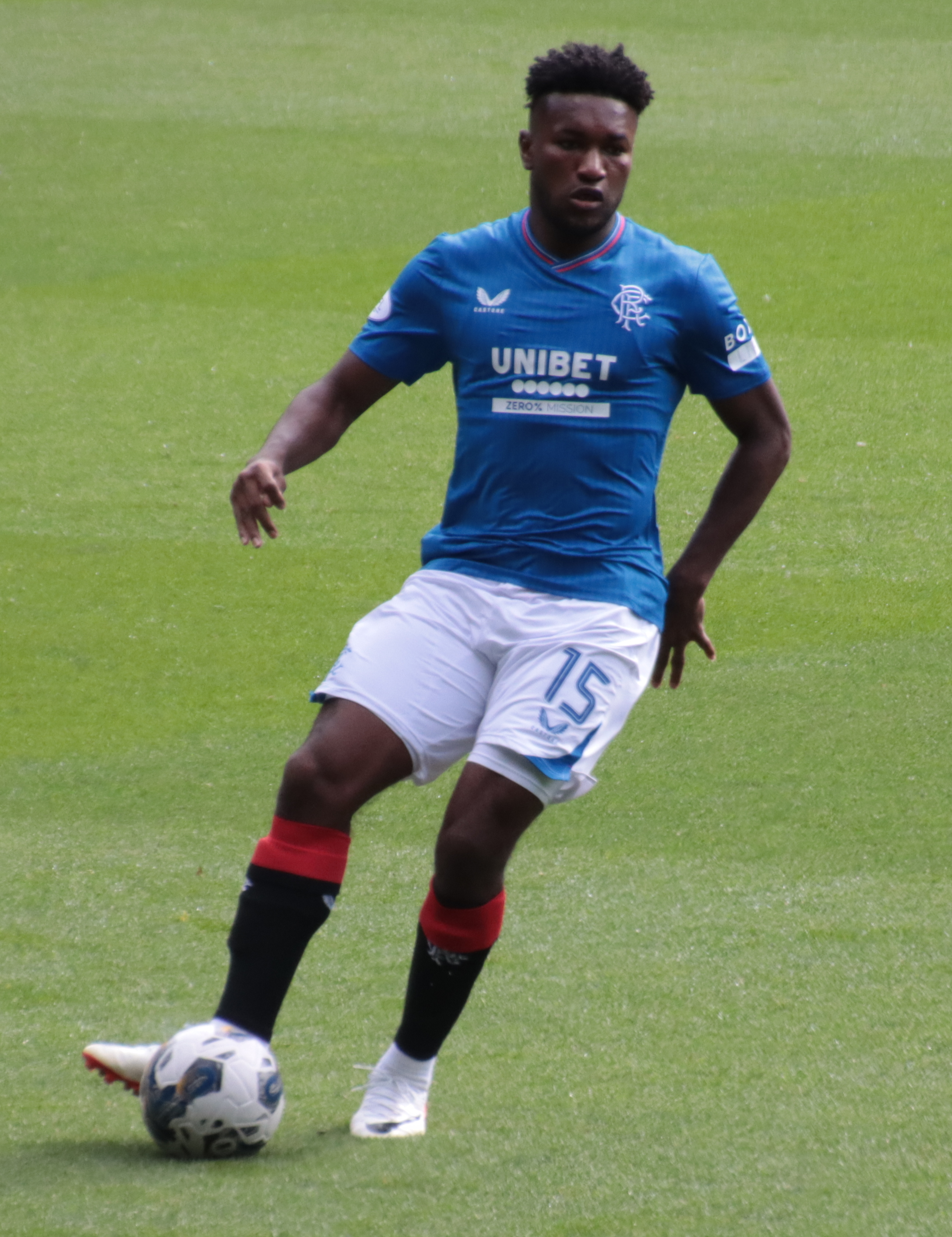
- Cifuentes playing for Rangers in 2023

Personal information
- Full name: José Adoni Cifuentes Charcopa
- Date of birth: 12 March 1999 (age 27)
- Place of birth: Esmeraldas, Ecuador
- Height: 1.76 m (5 ft 9 in)
- Position: Central midfielder

Team information
- Current team: Rangers

Youth career
- 2014–2016: Universidad Católica del Ecuador

Senior career*
Years	Team	Apps	(Gls)
2016–2020	Universidad Católica del Ecuador	7	(0)
2017–2019	→ América de Quito (loan)	68	(7)
2020–2023	Los Angeles FC	102	(14)
2023–	Rangers	9	(0)
2024	→ Cruzeiro (loan)	9	(0)
2024–2025	→ Aris (loan)	29	(1)
2025–2026	→ Toronto FC (loan)	17	(1)

International career^{‡}
2018–2019	Ecuador U20	19	(2)
2019–2020	Ecuador U23	6	(0)
2019–	Ecuador	21	(0)
Medal record
Men's football
Representing Ecuador
FIFA U-20 World Cup
Third place	2019 Poland
- * Club domestic league appearances and goals as of 23:06, 25 April 2026 (UTC) ‡ National team caps and goals as of 00:25, 13 June 2024 (UTC)

José Adoni Cifuentes Charcopa (born 12 March 1999) is an Ecuadorian professional footballer who plays as a central midfielder for Scottish Premiership club Rangers and the Ecuador national team.

Cifuentes began his club career in Ecuadorian football with Universidad Católica and América de Quito. He joined MLS club Los Angeles FC in January 2020. He made more than 100 appearances for LAFC and helped them win the Supporters' Shield and MLS Cup double in 2022. Cifuentes signed for Rangers in August 2023.

Cifuentes played youth international football for Ecuador at under-20 and under-23 levels. He made his senior international debut in September 2019.

== Club career ==
=== Universidad Católica and América de Quito ===
Cifuentes began his career at Ecuadorian club Universidad Católica, having joined their youth system in 2014. He was sent on loan to América de Quito from the 2017 season until the end of the 2019 season.

=== Los Angeles FC ===
In January 2020, Cifuentes joined Major League Soccer club Los Angeles FC on a four-year contract, for a reported transfer fee of $3 million. He helped LAFC win the Supporters' Shield and MLS Cup double in the 2022 season, and reach the final of the 2023 CONCACAF Champions League.

=== Rangers ===
On 3 August 2023, he signed for Scottish Premiership club Rangers for an undisclosed fee, signing a four-year contract. The reported fee paid for Cifuentes was £1.2 million ($1.5 million). He made his Rangers debut on 9 August, during a UEFA Champions League qualifying match against Swiss side Servette.

==== Loan to Cruzeiro ====
On 7 February 2024, Cifuentes joined Cruzeiro on loan until the end of 2024.

==== Loan to Aris ====
Cifuentes joined Aris on a one-year loan spell on 13 August 2024.

==== Loan to Toronto FC ====
Cifuentes joined Toronto FC on loan on 22 August 2025. The loan is set to run until June 2026, with a purchase option included in the deal.

The midfielder did not occupy an international roster spot from the club, due to MLS rules regarding US Green Card holders and rules for Canadian MLS teams.

== International career ==
=== Youth ===
Cifuentes played youth international football for Ecuador at under-20 and under-23 levels, making 19 appearances for the under-20 team and six appearances for the under-23 team. He represented the under-20 team at the 2019 South American U-20 Championship, which Ecuador won, and the 2019 FIFA U-20 World Cup, where Ecuador finished third. In the latter tournament, Cifuentes scored the opening goal in a 2–1 victory over the United States.

=== Senior ===
Cifuentes was called up to the senior Ecuador national team for the first time for friendlies against Peru and Bolivia in September 2019. He made his senior international debut on 5 September 2019, against Peru.

Cifuentes was a member of Ecuador's squad for the 2022 FIFA World Cup and made two appearances at the tournament.

Cifuentes was called up to the final 26-man Ecuador squad for the 2024 Copa América.

== Career statistics ==
=== Club ===
As of match played 25 April 2026

Appearances and goals by club, season and competition
Club	Season	League			National cup		League cup		Continental		Other		Total	
Club	Season	Division	Apps	Goals	Apps	Goals	Apps	Goals	Apps	Goals	Apps	Goals	Apps	Goals
Universidad Católica	2016	Ecuadorian Serie A	4	0	0	0	—		0	0	—		4	0
Universidad Católica	2017	Ecuadorian Serie A	3	0	0	0	—		0	0	—		3	0
Universidad Católica	Total		7	0	0	0	—		0	0	—		7	0
América de Quito (loan)	2017	Ecuadorian Serie B	22	2	0	0	—		—		—		22	2
América de Quito (loan)	2018	Ecuadorian Serie B	29	5	0	0	—		—		—		29	5
América de Quito (loan)	2019	Ecuadorian Serie A	17	0	2	1	—		—		—		19	1
América de Quito (loan)	Total		68	7	2	1	—		—		—		70	8
Los Angeles FC	2020	Major League Soccer	18 (Note: Includes three appearances in MLS is Back Tournament group stage)	1	0	0	—		3 (Note: Appearances in CONCACAF Champions League)	0	2 (Note: Appearances in MLS is Back Tournament knockout stage)	0	23	1
Los Angeles FC	2021	Major League Soccer	32	5	—		—		—		—		32	5
Los Angeles FC	2022	Major League Soccer	33	7	3	0	—		—		3 (Note: Appearances in MLS Cup playoffs)	0	39	7
Los Angeles FC	2023	Major League Soccer	19	1	0	0	—		7	1	—		26	2
Los Angeles FC	Total		102	14	3	0	—		10	1	5	0	120	15
Rangers	2023–24	Scottish Premiership	9	0	0	0	2	0	9 (Note: Four appearances in UEFA Champions League, five appearances in UEFA Europa League)	0	—		20	0
Cruzeiro (loan)	2024	Série A	3	0	0	0	—		3 (Note: Appearances in Copa Sudamericana)	0	6 (Note: Appearances in Campeonato Mineiro)	0	9	0
Aris (loan)	2024–25	Super League Greece	29	1	2	0	—		—		—		31	1
Toronto FC (loan)	2025	Major League Soccer	7	0	—		—		—		—		7	0
Toronto FC (loan)	2026	Major League Soccer	10	1	0	0	—		—		0	0	10	1
Toronto FC (loan)	Total		17	1	0	0	—		—		0	0	17	1
Career total			232	23	7	1	2	0	22	1	11	0	274	25

=== International ===
As of match played 12 June 2024

Appearances and goals by national team and year
National team	Year	Apps	Goals
Ecuador	2019	3	0
Ecuador	2020	0	0
Ecuador	2021	3	0
Ecuador	2022	7	0
Ecuador	2023	6	0
Ecuador	2024	2	0
Total		21	0

== Honours ==
Los Angeles FC

- MLS Cup: 2022
- Supporters' Shield: 2022

Rangers FC

- Scottish League Cup: 2023
