= Kwadwo Opoku =

Ghanaian footballer (born 2001)

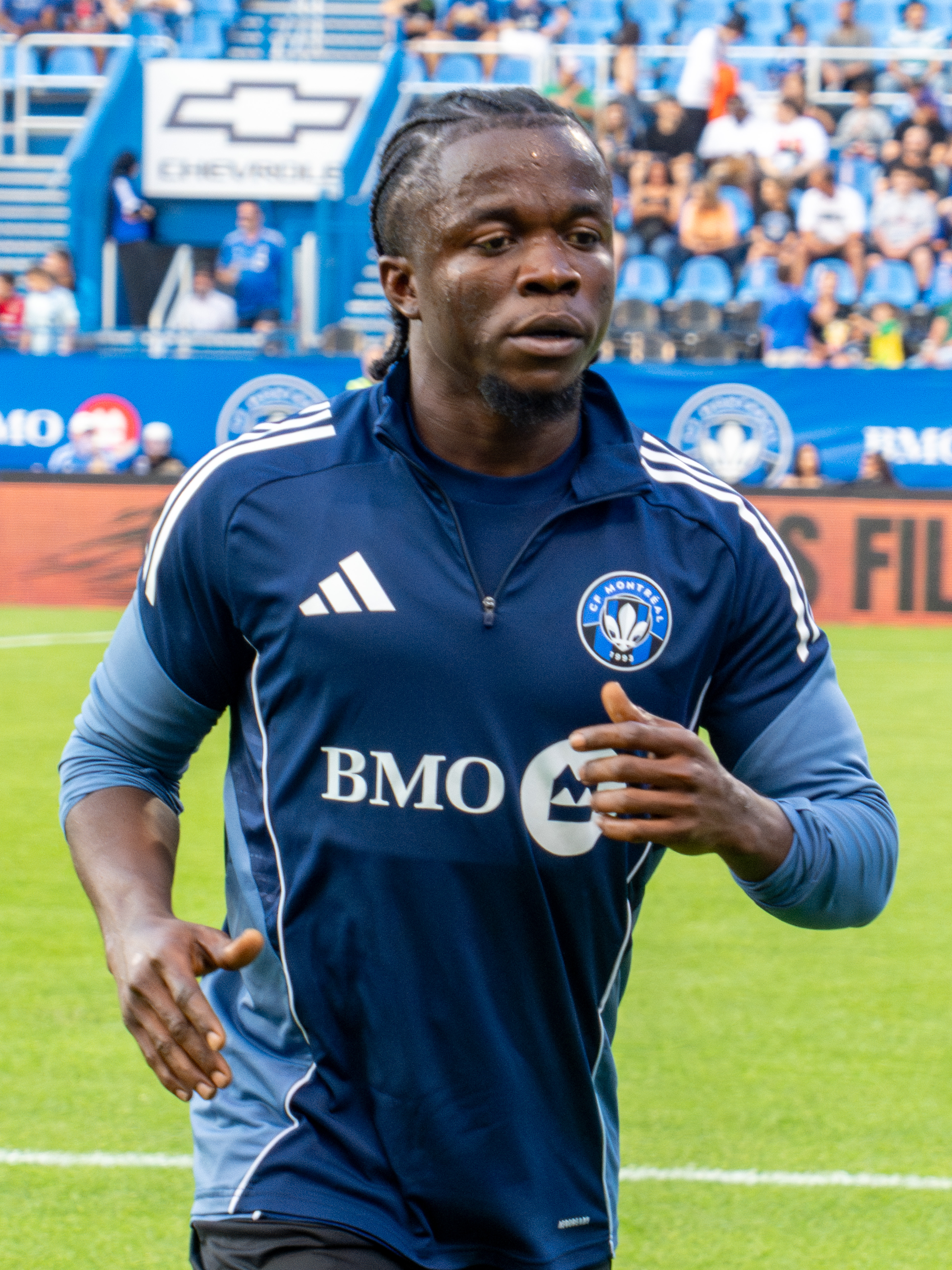
- Opoku in 2025

Personal information
- Date of birth: 13 July 2001 (age 25)
- Place of birth: Accra, Ghana
- Height: 1.70 m (5 ft 7 in)
- Position: Forward

Team information
- Current team: Panetolikos
- Number: 90

Youth career
- Attram De Visser

Senior career*
Years	Team	Apps	(Gls)
	Attram De Visser	64	(29)
2020–2023	Los Angeles FC	60	(9)
2021	→ Las Vegas Lights (loan)	1	(0)
2023–2026	CF Montréal	42	(7)
2026–	Panetolikos	3	(2)

International career
- Ghana U17
- Ghana U20
- * Club domestic league appearances and goals as of 23:30, 20 September 2026 (UTC)

Kwadwo Opoku (born 13 July 2001), commonly known as Mahala, is a Ghanaian professional footballer who plays as a forward for Greek Super League club Panetolikos.

== Club career ==
He began his career with Attram De Visser, scoring 29 goals in 64 matches.

In October 2020, Opoku signed with Major League Soccer club Los Angeles FC. He made his debut on 12 October against Seattle Sounders FC. He scored his first goal for the club on 16 December 2020, to give his side a 2–1 victory over Mexican club Cruz Azul in the CONCACAF Champions League quarter-finals. On 12 May 2021, he was loaned to the Las Vegas Lights in the USL Championship for a match against Sacramento Republic FC. He scored his first MLS goal on 12 March 2022 against Inter Miami CF. In 2022, he won the MLS double of the MLS Supporters Shield and MLS Cup with the club.

In July 2023, Opoku was traded to CF Montréal, in exchange for $1.75 million in General Allocation Money. He made his debut on 13 July against the Chicago Fire. On 16 July, he scored his first goal for Montreal against Charlotte FC. On 24 July 2023, the club extended his contract through the 2026 season, with an option for 2027.

On 29 June 2026, Opuku was transferred to Greek Super League side Panetolikos.

== International career ==
Mahala represented Ghana U17 at the 2017 U-17 Africa Cup of Nations and also represented the Ghana U20.

In June 2023, he was named to the provisional squad for Ghana U23 for the 2023 U-23 Africa Cup of Nations. However, his club team Los Angeles FC, chose to not release him for the tournament.

== Career statistics ==
As of match played 22 July 2023

Appearances and goals by club, season and competition
Club	Season	League			Playoffs		Cup		Continental		Other		Total	
Club	Season	Division	Apps	Goals	Apps	Goals	Apps	Goals	Apps	Goals	Apps	Goals	Apps	Goals
Los Angeles FC	2020	Major League Soccer	3	0	1	0	—		2	1	—		6	1
Los Angeles FC	2021	Major League Soccer	4	0	—		—		—		—		4	0
Los Angeles FC	2022	Major League Soccer	34	7	3	1	3	0	—		—		40	8
Los Angeles FC	2023	Major League Soccer	19	2	0	0	1	0	8	2	0	0	28	4
Los Angeles FC	Total		60	9	4	1	4	0	10	3	0	0	78	13
Las Vegas Lights (loan)	2021	USL Championship	1	0	—		—		—		—		1	0
CF Montréal	2023	Major League Soccer	2	1	0	0	0	0	—		1 (Note: Appearance(s) in Leagues Cup)	0	3	1
Career total			63	10	4	1	4	0	10	3	1	0	82	14

== Honours ==
Los Angeles FC

- MLS Cup: 2022
- Supporters' Shield: 2022
