= Tomás Romero (footballer) =

Footballer (born 2000)

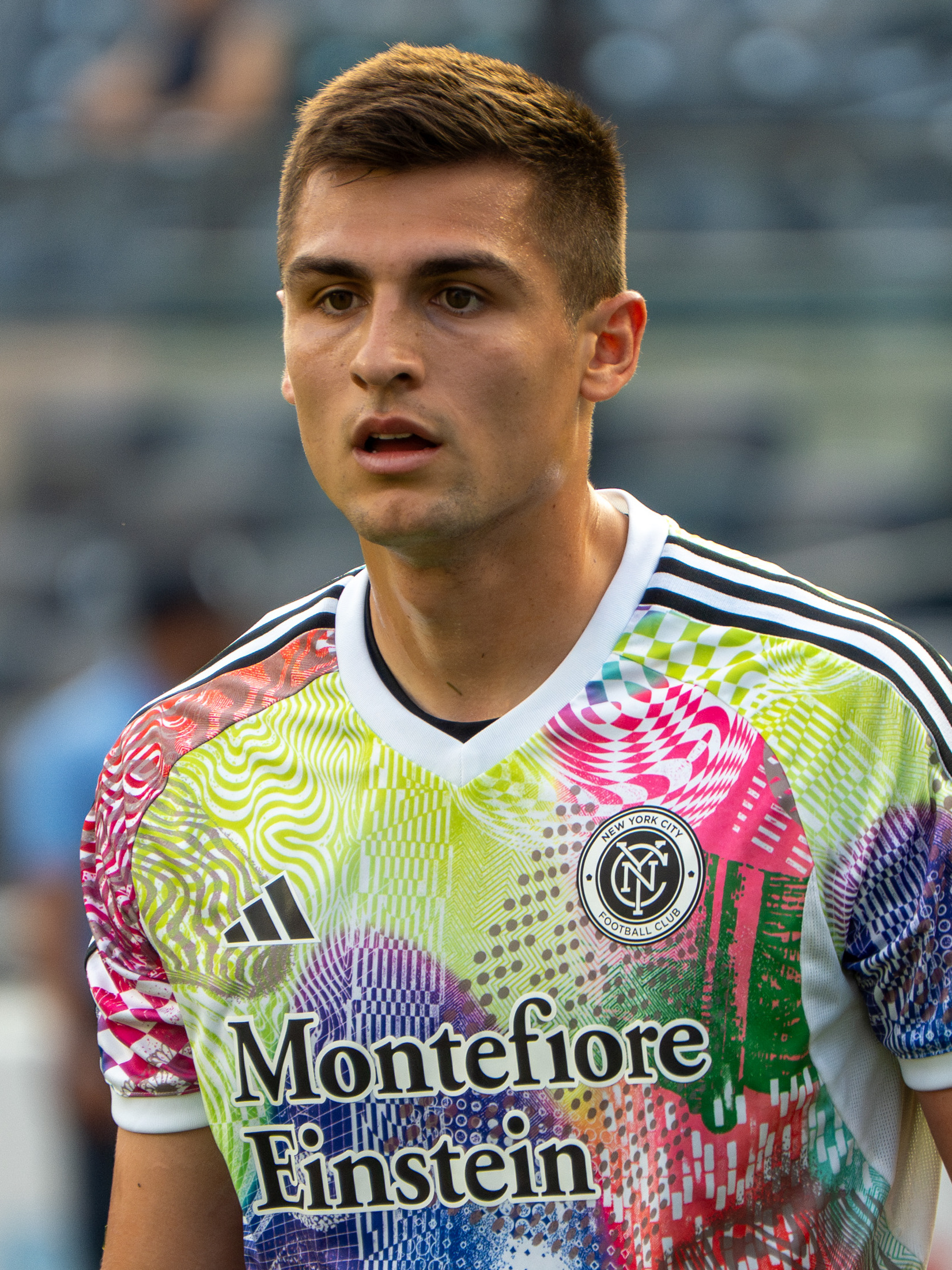
- Romero with New York City FC in 2025

Personal information
- Full name: Tomás Líam Romero Keubler
- Date of birth: 19 December 2000 (age 25)
- Place of birth: Cherry Hill, New Jersey, United States
- Height: 1.88 m (6 ft 2 in)
- Position: Goalkeeper

Team information
- Current team: New York City FC
- Number: 30

Youth career
- Real Jersey FC
- Philadelphia Union

College career
| Years | Team | Apps | (Gls) |
| 2019–2020 | Georgetown Hoyas | 12 | (0) |

Senior career*
| Years | Team | Apps | (Gls) |
| 2017–2019 | Bethlehem Steel | 17 | (0) |
| 2021–2022 | Los Angeles FC | 18 | (0) |
| 2021–2022 | → Las Vegas Lights (loan) | 18 | (0) |
| 2023 | Toronto FC | 6 | (0) |
| 2023 | → Toronto FC II | 1 | (0) |
| 2024– | New York City FC | 7 | (0) |
| 2024– | → New York City FC II | 10 | (0) |

International career^{‡}
| 2016–2017 | El Salvador U17 | 7 | (0) |
| 2021 | El Salvador U23 | 1 | (0) |
| 2021– | El Salvador | 18 | (0) |
- * Club domestic league appearances and goals as of 17 March 2024 ‡ National team caps and goals as of 4 April 2025

Tomás Líam Romero Keubler (born 19 December 2000) is a professional footballer who plays as a goalkeeper for New York City FC in Major League Soccer. Born in the United States, he plays for the El Salvador national team.

== Early life ==
He played youth soccer with Real Jersey FC, before later joining the Philadelphia Union's YSC Academy when he was in eighth grade.

== College career ==
In December 2017, he committed to Georgetown University to play for the men's soccer team starting in 2019. He made his debut and earned his first victory and clean sheet on 2 September against the Temple Owls. In November 2019, he was named the Big East Conference Goalkeeper of the Week. In December 2019, he helped the Hoyas win the National title, making the game-winning penalty shootout save, to lead Georgetown to their first-ever National Title in soccer. He was unable to play in 2020, as the season was cancelled due to the COVID-19 pandemic.

== Club career ==
On 10 September 2016, Romero was called up to the Union's USL affiliate Bethlehem Steel FC to serve as the backup keeper for a match against the Charleston Battery. In the offseason, he attended training camp with both Bethlehem and the Philadelphia Union. On 1 April 2017, he made his professional debut at age 16 for the Steel, against the Rochester Rhinos, becoming the youngest goalkeeper to start a USL match. In July 2019, he was named USL Championship Player of the Week, after recording a career-high 11 saves ina 1–0 win over Louisville City FC on 20 July 2019. During the fall of 2020, he trained with Philadelphia Union II (the renamed Bethlehem Steel), after the Georgetown season was cancelled due to the COVID-19 pandemic.

In January 2021, he joined Major League Soccer club Los Angeles FC, after the club acquired his homegrown player rights from the Union for $50,000 in general allocation money. He officially signed his first professional contract with LAFC on 1 February 2021. He began the 2021 season on loan with the club's USL Championship affiliate team, the Las Vegas Lights. On 23 June 2021, Romero made his MLS debut with LAFC in a 2–0 win over FC Dallas, keeping a clean sheet. He returned to Las Vegas on loan in 2022. He was part of LAFC's 2022 MLS Cup winning squad, although he did not feature in any matches that season. After the 2022 season, LAFC declined his club option for the 2023 season.

In November 2022, at the 2022 MLS Re-Entry Draft, Toronto FC claimed his contract for the 2023 season, re-uniting him with Bob Bradley, who was his former head coach at LAFC in 2021. In 2023, he was loaned to the second team, Toronto FC II for some matches, making his debut on 23 April against Philadelphia Union II. He made his debut for the first team on 8 July against St. Louis City SC. At the end of the 2023 season, the club declined his option for the 2024 season.

In February 2024, he signed a one-year contract with New York City FC.

== International career ==
Romero was eligible to represent the United States, where he was born, and El Salvador through descent.

In August 2016, he was called up to the El Salvador national U17 team for the first time. He made his debut with the U17s at the Central American Qualifying tournament for the 2017 CONCACAF U17 Championship on 21 November 2016 against Belize U17. He subsequently represented the side at the 2017 CONCACAF U-17 Championship in Panama. He also played with the side at the 2017 Bolivarian Games.

In June 2019, he was called up to the El Salvador U23 for the Olympic qualifiers. He made his debut for the U23s against Haiti U23 on 26 March 2021.

On 31 May 2021, the Salvadoran Football Federation released a statement that Romero had declined an invitation to the El Salvador senior team because he wanted to maintain the possibility of playing for the United States. However, he subequenltly committed to El Salvador and debuted for the senior team in a friendly 1–1 draw against Ecuador on 5 December 2021.

== Career statistics ==
=== Club ===
As of match played 20 September 2023

| Club | Season | League | | | Playoffs | | National Cup | | Continental | | Other | | Total | |
| Club | Season | Division | Apps | Goals | Apps | Goals | Apps | Goals | Apps | Goals | Apps | Goals | Apps | Goals |
|---|---|---|---|---|---|---|---|---|---|---|---|---|---|---|
| Bethlehem Steel FC | 2017 | USL | 7 | 0 | 0 | 0 | – | | – | | — | | 7 | 0 |
| Bethlehem Steel FC | 2018 | USL | 1 | 0 | 0 | 0 | – | | – | | — | | 1 | 0 |
| Bethlehem Steel FC | 2019 | USL Championship | 9 | 0 | – | | – | | – | | — | | 9 | 0 |
| Bethlehem Steel FC | Total | | 17 | 0 | 0 | 0 | 0 | 0 | 0 | 0 | 0 | 0 | 17 | 0 |
| Los Angeles FC | 2021 | Major League Soccer | 18 | 0 | – | | – | | – | | — | | 18 | 0 |
| Los Angeles FC | 2022 | Major League Soccer | 0 | 0 | 0 | 0 | 0 | 0 | – | | — | | 0 | 0 |
| Los Angeles FC | Total | | 18 | 0 | 0 | 0 | 0 | 0 | 0 | 0 | 0 | 0 | 18 | 0 |
| Las Vegas Lights FC (loan) | 2021 | USL Championship | 5 | 0 | – | | – | | – | | — | | 5 | 0 |
| Las Vegas Lights FC (loan) | 2022 | USL Championship | 13 | 0 | – | | – | | – | | — | | 13 | 0 |
| Las Vegas Lights FC (loan) | Total | | 18 | 0 | 0 | 0 | 0 | 0 | 0 | 0 | 0 | 0 | 18 | 0 |
| Toronto FC | 2023 | Major League Soccer | 6 | 0 | – | | 0 | 0 | – | | 0 | 0 | 6 | 0 |
| Toronto FC II (loan) | 2023 | MLS Next Pro | 1 | 0 | – | | – | | – | | — | | 1 | 0 |
| Career total | | | 60 | 0 | 0 | 0 | 0 | 0 | 0 | 0 | 0 | 0 | 60 | 0 |

=== International ===
As of match played 27 March 2024

Appearances and goals by national team and year
| National team | Year | Apps | Goals |
|---|---|---|---|
| El Salvador | 2021 | 2 | 0 |
| El Salvador | 2022 | 3 | 0 |
| El Salvador | 2023 | 7 | 0 |
| El Salvador | 2024 | 1 | 0 |
| Total | | 13 | 0 |
