= Christopher Jaime =

American soccer player (born 2004)

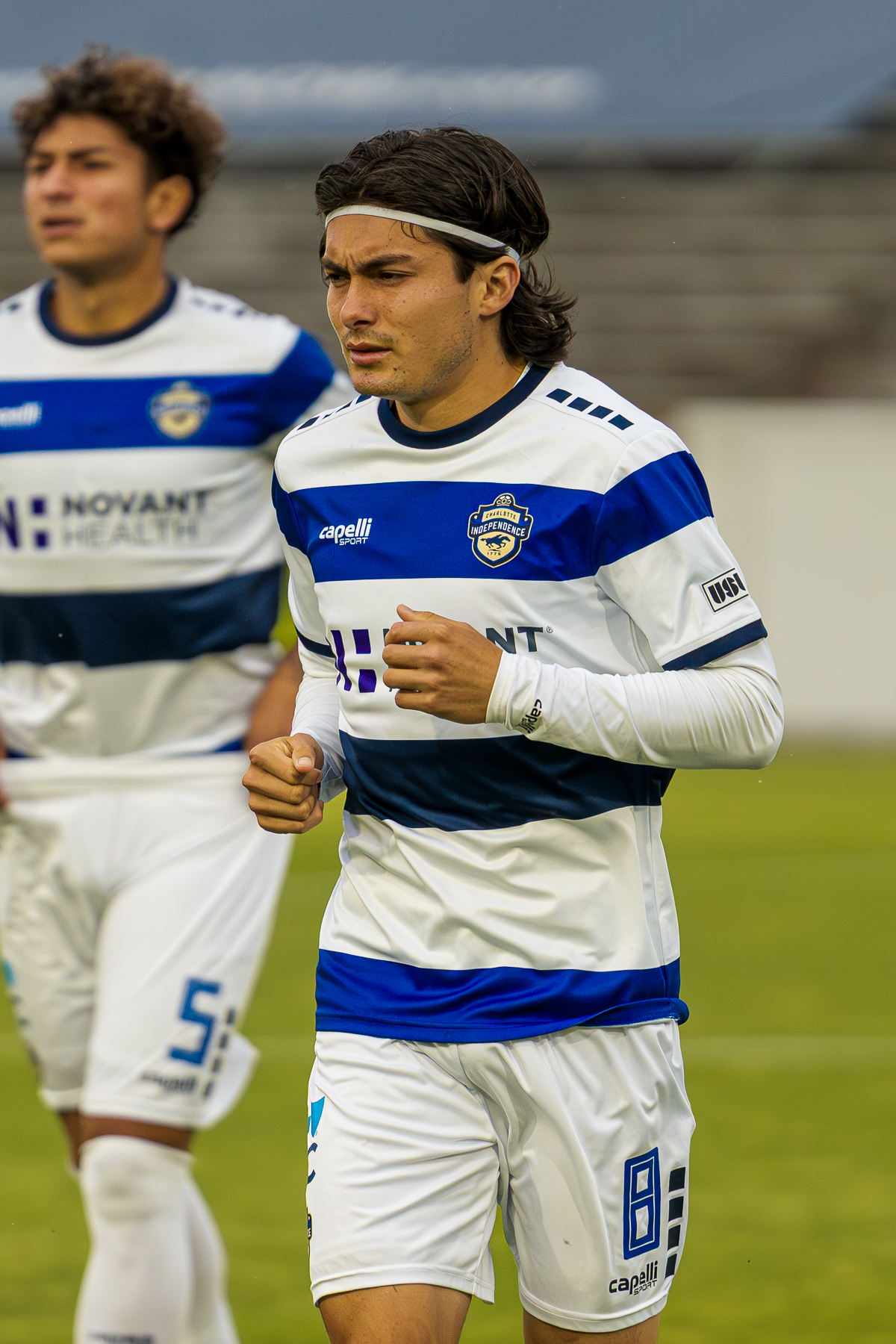
- Jaime with Charlotte Independence in 2026

Personal information
- Full name: Christopher Jaime
- Date of birth: March 20, 2004 (age 22)
- Place of birth: San Diego, California, United States
- Height: 5 ft 10 in (1.78 m)
- Position: Midfielder

Team information
- Current team: Charlotte Independence
- Number: 8

Youth career
- –2019: Nomads SC
- 2019–2022: Los Angeles FC

Senior career*
Years	Team	Apps	(Gls)
2021–2022	Las Vegas Lights	41	(1)
2023–2024	Los Angeles FC 2	46	(5)
2023	Los Angeles FC	0	(0)
2025–	Charlotte Independence	50	(3)
- * Club domestic league appearances and goals as of October 31, 2026

Christopher Jaime (born March 20, 2004) is an American professional soccer player who plays as a midfielder for Charlotte Independence in the USL League One.

== Club career ==
Born in San Diego, California, Jaime began his career with U.S. Soccer Development Academy side Nomads SC. In 2019, Jaime joined the academy at Major League Soccer club Los Angeles FC. On May 5, 2021, it was announced that Jaime, along with three other academy players, had signed USL academy contracts with Los Angeles FC's USL Championship affiliate club Las Vegas Lights. The academy contract allowed Son to play with professionals while maintaining NCAA college soccer eligibility.

Jaime made his professional debut for Las Vegas Lights on June 19, 2021, against Orange County SC. He came on as a 62nd-minute substitute as Las Vegas lost 3–1.

On August 25, 2022, Jaime signed a professional deal with Las Vegas for the remainder of the 2022 season.

On March 27, 2025, Jaime joined USL League One club Charlotte Independence.

== Career statistics ==
As of match played July 13, 2022

Appearances and goals by club, season and competition
Club	Season	League			National Cup		Continental		Other		Total	
Club	Season	Division	Apps	Goals	Apps	Goals	Apps	Goals	Apps	Goals	Apps	Goals
Las Vegas Lights	2021	USL Championship	16	1	–		–		–		16	1
Las Vegas Lights	2022	USL Championship	15	0	1	0	–		–		16	0
Las Vegas Lights	Total		31	1	1	0	0	0	0	0	32	1
Career total			31	1	1	0	0	0	0	0	32	1
