= Paul Son =

American soccer player

Personal information
- Full name: Paul Son
- Date of birth: January 27, 2003 (age 23)
- Place of birth: Anaheim, California, United States
- Height: 5 ft 10 in (1.78 m)
- Position: Left-back

Team information
- Current team: Las Vegas Lights
- Number: 25

Youth career
- 2016–2020: Strikers FC

Senior career*
Years	Team	Apps	(Gls)
2021–	Las Vegas Lights	3	(0)
- * Club domestic league appearances and goals as of 18:12, 30 May 2021 (UTC)~

Paul Son (born January 27, 2003) is an American soccer player who plays as a left-back for USL Championship club Las Vegas Lights.

== Club career ==
Born in Anaheim, California, Son began his career with U.S. Soccer Development Academy side Strikers FC in 2016. In 2019, Son joined the youth setup at Major League Soccer club Los Angeles FC. On May 5, 2021, it was announced that Son, along with three other academy players, had signed USL academy contracts with Los Angeles FC's USL Championship affiliate club Las Vegas Lights. The academy contract allowed Son to play with professionals while maintaining NCAA college soccer eligibility.

Son made his professional debut for Las Vegas Lights on May 12, 2021, against Sacramento Republic. He came on as an 84th-minute substitute for Danny Musovski as Lights lose 3–1.

== Career statistics ==
As of match played May 29, 2021

Appearances and goals by club, season and competition
Club	Season	League			National Cup		Continental		Total	
Club	Season	Division	Apps	Goals	Apps	Goals	Apps	Goals	Apps	Goals
Las Vegas Lights	2021	USL Championship	3	0	0	0	—		3	0
Career total			3	0	0	0	0	0	3	0
