= Mamadou Mbacke =

Senegalese footballer (born 2002)

Personal information
- Full name: Mamadou Ibra Mbacke Fall
- Date of birth: 21 November 2002 (age 23)
- Place of birth: Rufisque, Senegal
- Height: 1.87 m (6 ft 2 in)
- Position: Centre-back

Team information
- Current team: St. Louis City SC
- Number: 4

Youth career
- Montverde Academy

Senior career*
Years	Team	Apps	(Gls)
2021–2024	Los Angeles FC	35	(5)
2021	→ Las Vegas Lights (loan)	8	(0)
2022–2023	→ Villarreal B (loan)	25	(3)
2022–2023	→ Villarreal (loan)	1	(0)
2023	Los Angeles FC 2	2	(0)
2023–2024	→ Barcelona B (loan)	22	(2)
2024–2026	Barcelona B	29	(0)
2026–	St. Louis City SC	0	(0)
2026–	St. Louis City 2	1	(0)
- * Club domestic league appearances and goals as of 22:43, 8 March 2026 (CST)

Mamadou Ibra Mbacke Fall (born 21 November 2002) is a Senegalese professional footballer who plays as a centre-back for Major League Soccer team St. Louis City SC.

== Club career ==
Born in Rufisque, Senegal, Mbacke moved to Orlando, Florida in the United States to join the Montverde Academy as part of Sport4Charity, an organization ran by former Senegal international footballer Salif Diao. On 5 June 2021, Mbacke joined Major League Soccer club Los Angeles FC, signing a two-year contract.

On 11 June 2021, Mbacke was loaned by Los Angeles FC to their USL Championship affiliate Las Vegas Lights. He made his professional debut for the club later that night against San Antonio FC, starting and playing 79 minutes in the 1–1 draw. On September 3, 2021, Mbacke scored a brace in a 4–0 win over Sporting Kansas City.

On 25 August 2022, Mbacke was loaned to Villarreal in Spain until June 2023, where he had previously trained with their youth teams. The following day, the loan deal was confirmed, with the player being assigned to the reserves in Segunda División.

Following a loan spell to Barcelona Atlètic, the reserve team of FC Barcelona, during the 2023–24 season, on 22 July 2024, Mbacke joined the club on a permanent basis, signing a two-year contract, with an option for two more seasons.

On January 29, 2026, Mbacke was signed to Major League Soccer side, Saint Louis City SC on a permanent transfer, signing with the club through June 30, 2028, with an option for the 2028-2029 and 2029-2030 seasons.

== International career ==
Mbacke was called up to the Senegal under-17 side in 2019.

== Career statistics ==
As of match played 30 January 2026

Appearances and goals by club, season and competition
Club	Season	League			National Cup (Note: Includes Copa del Rey and U.S. Open Cup)		Other		Total		
Club	Season	Division	Apps	Goals	Apps	Goals	Apps	Goals	Apps	Goals	
Los Angeles FC	2021	MLS	19	4	0	0	0	0	19	4	
Los Angeles FC	2022	MLS	16	1	3	1	0	0	19	2	
Los Angeles FC	2023	MLS	1	0	0	0	1 (Note: Appearance in Leagues Cup)	0	2	0	
Los Angeles FC	Total		36	5	3	1	1	0	40	6	
Las Vegas Lights (loan)	2021	USL Championship	8	0	0	0	0	0	8	0	
Villarreal B (loan)	2022–23	Segunda División	25	3	—		0	0	25	3	
Villarreal (loan)	2022–23	La Liga	1	0	1	0	0	0	2	0	
Los Angeles FC 2	2023	MLS Next Pro	2	0	—		0	0	2	0	
Barcelona B (loan)	2023–24	Primera Federación	22	2	—		0	0	22	2	
Barcelona B	2024–25	Primera Federación	25	0	—		—		25	0	
Barcelona B	2025–26	Segunda Federación	4	0	—		—		4	0	
Barcelona B	Total		51	2	0	0	0	0	51	2	
St. Louis City SC	2026	Major League Soccer	0	0	—		—		0	0	
St. Louis City SC	Career total			123	10	4	1	1	0	128	11
