= Julian Gaines =

American soccer player (born 2002)

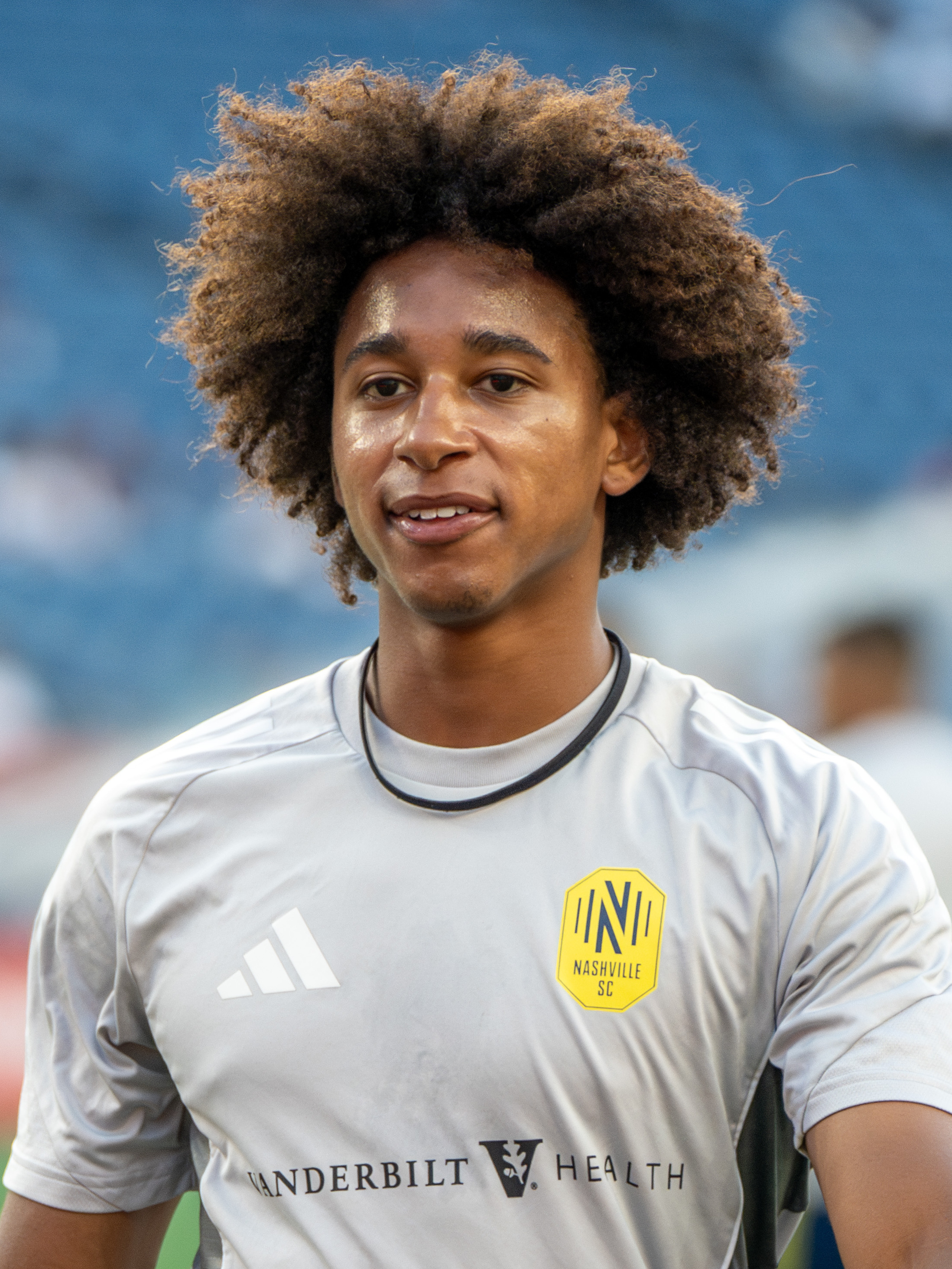
- Gaines with Nashville SC in 2025

Personal information
- Full name: Julian Gaines
- Date of birth: November 5, 2002 (age 24)
- Place of birth: Austin, Texas, United States
- Height: 5 ft 10 in (1.78 m)
- Position: Right-back

Team information
- Current team: Huntsville City

Youth career
- 2015–2019: Lonestar SC
- 2019–2020: Barça Residency Academy

Senior career*
Years	Team	Apps	(Gls)
2019	Austin Bold	1	(0)
2021	Las Vegas Lights	12	(1)
2021–2023	Los Angeles FC	2	(0)
2022	→ Las Vegas Lights (loan)	10	(1)
2023	→ Los Angeles FC 2 (loan)	20	(0)
2024–2025	Nashville SC	4	(0)
2024–2025	→ Huntsville City FC (loan)	6	(1)
2026–	Huntsville City FC	0	(0)

International career
2017	United States U15	5	(2)
- * Club domestic league appearances and goals as of March 13, 2026

Julian Gaines (born November 5, 2002) is an American professional soccer player who plays as a right-back for MLS Next Pro club Huntsville City FC.

== Club career ==
=== Los Angeles FC ===
On August 19, 2021, Gaines joined Major League Soccer club Los Angeles FC. Gaines was signed through the MLS Waiver Order, with Los Angeles FC trading $50,000 in General Allocation Money and the 21st spot in the Waiver Order to Toronto FC to acquire the number one spot.

On March 11, 2022, Gaines was loaned to Las Vegas Lights FC.

On February 20, 2024, Gaines signed with Nashville SC following his release from LAFC at the conclusion of their 2023 season.

== Career statistics ==
=== Club ===
As of match played July 17, 2021

Appearances and goals by club, season and competition
Club	Season	League			National cup		Continental		Total	
Club	Season	Division	Apps	Goals	Apps	Goals	Apps	Goals	Apps	Goals
Austin Bold	2019	USL Championship	1	0	0	0	—		1	0
Las Vegas Lights	2021	USL Championship	12	1	—		—		12	1
Los Angeles FC	2021	Major League Soccer	0	0	—		—		0	0
Career total			13	1	0	0	0	0	13	1
