= Marvin Gamez =

American soccer player

Personal information
- Full name: Marvin Gamez
- Date of birth: July 21, 2003 (age 23)
- Place of birth: Bell Gardens, California, United States
- Position: Forward

Team information
- Current team: Las Vegas Lights
- Number: 29

Youth career
- FC Golden State
- Los Angeles FC

Senior career*
| Years | Team | Apps | (Gls) |
| 2021– | → Las Vegas Lights (loan) | 3 | (1) |
- * Club domestic league appearances and goals as of November 8, 2021

Marvin Gamez (born July 21, 2003) is an American soccer player who plays as a midfielder for USL Championship club Las Vegas Lights via the Los Angeles FC academy.

== Club career ==
Gamez played as part of the USSDA academy side for FC Golden State, before joining MLS side Los Angeles FC's academy. In 2021, Gamez spent time with LAFC's USL Championship affiliate side Las Vegas Lights.

Gamez made his professional debut for Las Vegas Lights on June 19, 2021, against Orange County SC. He came on as an 89th-minute substitute as Las Vegas lost 3–1.

== Career statistics ==
As of match played November 8, 2021

Appearances and goals by club, season and competition
| Club | Season | League | | | National Cup | | Continental | | Total | |
| Club | Season | Division | Apps | Goals | Apps | Goals | Apps | Goals | Apps | Goals |
|---|---|---|---|---|---|---|---|---|---|---|
| Las Vegas Lights | 2021 | USL Championship | 3 | 1 | 0 | 0 | — | | 3 | 1 |
| Career total | | | 3 | 1 | 0 | 0 | 0 | 0 | 3 | 1 |
