= CC Uche =

American soccer player

Personal information
- Full name: Chinenye Chidera Uche
- Date of birth: March 3, 1998 (age 28)
- Place of birth: Queens, New York, United States
- Height: 1.86 m (6 ft 1 in)
- Position: Defender

Youth career
- 2014–2015: Georgia United

College career
| Years | Team | Apps | (Gls) |
| 2016–2017 | Duke Blue Devils | 18 | (0) |
| 2018–2019 | Ohio State Buckeyes | 22 | (0) |

Senior career*
| Years | Team | Apps | (Gls) |
| 2018 | Chicago FC United | 9 | (0) |
| 2021 | Las Vegas Lights | 26 | (1) |
| 2022–2023 | Minnesota United 2 | 22 | (0) |
| 2024 | Lexington SC | 11 | (0) |
- * Club domestic league appearances and goals as of November 21, 2024

Chinenye Chidera "CC" Uche (born March 3, 1998) is an American professional soccer player.

== Career ==
=== Youth ===
Uche played as part of the Georgia United academy during their 2014–15 season. Uche also spent time in South America training with River Plate in Argentina and O'Higgins in Chile.

=== College and amateur ===
In 2016, Uche attended Duke University to play college soccer. Uche appeared in 18 games for the Blue Devils, but only played 3-minutes of soccer in his 2017 season. In 2018, Uche transferred to Ohio State University, starting every game of the season during his junior season, but only playing 4 games in 2019 before suffering a season-ending leg injury.

During 2018, Uche also played in the USL PDL with Chicago FC United, appearing in 9 regular season games and making 3 playoff appearances.

=== Professional ===
On January 21, 2021, Uche was selected 41st overall in the 2021 MLS SuperDraft by Los Angeles FC. On April 5, 2021, it was announced that Uche had signed with Los Angeles FC's USL Championship affiliate side Las Vegas Lights.

On March 3, 2022, Uche signed as a free agent with MLS side Minnesota United .

On May 17, 2024, Uche was announced as a new signing for Lexington SC. He then played for Lexington till the end of 2024 season.
