= Bryce Duke =

American soccer player (born 2001)

- Duke playing for Wellington Phoenix in October 2026.

Personal information
- Full name: Bryce Michael Duke
- Date of birth: February 28, 2001 (age 25)
- Place of birth: Peoria, Arizona, US
- Height: 5 ft 7 in (1.70 m)
- Position: Midfielder

Team information
- Current team: Wellington Phoenix
- Number: 7

Youth career
- 2016–2018: Real Salt Lake
- 2018–2019: Barça Residency Academy

Senior career*
Years	Team	Apps	(Gls)
2020–2021	Los Angeles FC	26	(0)
2021	→ Las Vegas Lights (loan)	12	(1)
2022–2023	Inter Miami	35	(1)
2022	→ Inter Miami II (loan)	2	(0)
2023–2025	CF Montréal	76	(5)
2026	San Diego FC	5	(0)
2026–	Wellington Phoenix	0	(0)
- * Club domestic league appearances and goals as of September 10, 2026

Bryce Michael Duke (born February 28, 2001) is an American professional soccer player who plays as a midfielder for A-League Men club Wellington Phoenix.

== Career ==
Duke playing for Wellington Phoenix in 2026.

Duke was born and raised in Peoria, Arizona. He initially played youth soccer for CCV Stars in Casa Grande, Arizona. Following a trial in 2015, Duke was a part of the Real Salt Lake academy from 2016 to 2018 before joining the Barça Residency Academy. After spending one season with the academy, Duke signed a professional contract with Los Angeles FC of Major League Soccer on January 25, 2020.

Duke made his professional debut for the club on February 18, 2020, in their CONCACAF Champions League match against Club Leon. Duke's league debut came in the first game of the season on March 1, 2020, as a stoppage time substitution against Inter Miami CF.

On January 4, 2022, Duke was traded to Inter Miami in exchange for $100,000 of General Allocation Money.

On April 12, 2023, Duke was involved in a trade deal that saw him and teammate Ariel Lassiter move to CF Montréal in exchange for Kamal Miller and $1.3 million in general allocation money. Following the 2025 season, Duke's contract option was declined by Montréal.

On 16 September 2026, Duke joined A-League Men club Wellington Phoenix on a one-year deal, with an option for a further season if certain criteria are fulfilled.

== Career statistics ==
As of October 19, 2025

Club	Season	League			National cup (Note: Includes U.S. Open Cup and Canadian Championship)		Continental		Other		Total	
Club	Season	Division	Apps	Goals	Apps	Goals	Apps	Goals	Apps	Goals	Apps	Goals
Los Angeles FC	2020	Major League Soccer	11	0	—		1 (Note: Appearances in CONCACAF Champions League)	0	—		12	0
Los Angeles FC	2021	Major League Soccer	15	0	—		—		—		15	0
Los Angeles FC	Total		26	0	—		1	0	—		27	0
Las Vegas Lights (loan)	2021	USL Championship	12	1	—		—		—		12	1
Inter Miami	2022	Major League Soccer	28	1	3	0	—		1 (Note: Appearances in MLS Cup Playoffs)	0	32	1
Inter Miami	2023	Major League Soccer	7	0	—		—		—		7	0
Inter Miami	Total		35	1	3	0	—		1	0	39	1
Inter Miami CF II (loan)	2022	MLS Next Pro	2	0	—		—		—		2	0
CF Montréal	2023	Major League Soccer	26	2	3	0	—		2 (Note: Appearances in Leagues Cup)	1	31	3
CF Montréal	2024	Major League Soccer	32	3	2	1	—		4 (Note: Three appearances in Leagues Cup and one appearance in MLS Cup playoffs)	0	38	4
CF Montréal	2025	Major League Soccer	18	0	1	0	—		2	0	21	0
CF Montréal	Total		76	5	6	1	—		8	1	90	7
Wellington Phoenix	2026–27	A-League Men	2	0	—		—		0	0	0	0
Career total			151	7	9	1	1	0	9	1	170	9
