= Alvaro Quezada =

American soccer player (born 1999)

Álvaro Quezada
Personal information
- Full name: Álvaro Quezada
- Date of birth: March 4, 1999 (age 27)
- Place of birth: Palmdale, California, U.S.
- Height: 1.75 m (5 ft 9 in)
- Positions: Right-back; midfielder; forward

Team information
- Current team: El Paso Locomotive
- Number: 18

Youth career
- 2013–2017: LA Premier FC

College career
Years	Team	Apps	(Gls)
2017–2020	UC Irvine Anteaters	56	(8)

Senior career*
Years	Team	Apps	(Gls)
2021	Los Angeles FC	1	(0)
2021	→ Las Vegas Lights (loan)	15	(2)
2022	Las Vegas Lights	32	(2)
2024	Memphis 901	26	(1)
2025–	El Paso Locomotive	33	(1)
- * Club domestic league appearances and goals as of 21:05, 8 November 2026 (UTC)

Álvaro Quezada (born March 4, 1999) is an American professional soccer player who plays for El Paso Locomotive in the USL Championship.

== Career ==
=== Youth ===
Quezada played four seasons with LA Premier FC, now known as Los Angeles Surf Soccer Club, prior to attending college.

=== College ===
In 2017, Quezada attended University of California, Irvine to play college soccer. Over three seasons, Quezada made 55 appearances, scoring 8 goals and tallying 9 assists for the Anteaters. There was no 2020 season in the Big West Conference due to the COVID-19 pandemic.

=== Professional ===
On January 21, 2021, Quezada was selected 68th overall in the 2021 MLS SuperDraft by Los Angeles FC. Quezada was officially signed by the MLS side on April 24, 2021.

On May 5, 2021, Quezada was loaned to LAFC's USL Championship affiliate side Las Vegas Lights. Quezada made his professional debut the same day, starting in a 5–0 loss to LA Galaxy II. Quezada was released by Los Angeles following the 2021 season.

On February 4, 2022, Quezada signed with Las Vegas Lights ahead of their 2022 season.

After trialing with Memphis 901 during their 2023 season, he signed a multi-year deal with them on January 11, 2024. The club folded after the 2024 season

After Memphis suspended operations following the 2024 season, Quezada signed with El Paso Locomotive.
