= All-time Los Angeles FC roster =

This list comprises all players who have played for Los Angeles FC which dates from the team's inaugural Major League Soccer season in 2018 to present.

A "‡" denotes players who did not appear in a single match but were available for fixtures. Players who were acquired by the team but were not available to play in matches (e.g. selected in a draft but not signed, or acquired in a trade but immediately traded away) are not listed.

Bolded players are currently under contract by Los Angeles FC.

Stats include all competitive matches (MLS, MLS Cup Playoffs, U.S. Open Cup, CONCACAF Champions League, etc.).

All stats accurate as of end of 2025 season.

== Players ==
=== Outfield players ===
Name	D.O.B.	Position	Nationality	Years	Games	Goals	Debut	Ref
Kellyn Acosta	July 24, 1995	MF	United States	2022–2023	79	4	February 26, 2022	
Cristian Arango	March 9, 1995	FW	Colombia	2021–2022	57	35	August 8, 2021	
Eduard Atuesta	June 18, 1997	MF	Colombia	2018–2021	111	9	March 31, 2018	
Corey Baird	January 30, 1996	FW	United States	2021	13	3	April 17, 2021	
Gareth Bale	July 16, 1989	FW	Wales	2022	16	3	July 17, 2022	
Lamar Batista ‡	March 7, 1998	DF	United States	2019	0	0	N/A	
Steven Beitashour	February 1, 1987	DF	Iran	2018–2019	61	3	March 4, 2018	
Tristan Blackmon	August 12, 1996	DF	United States	2018–2021	79	2	March 4, 2018	
Latif Blessing	December 30, 1996	MF	Ghana	2018–2022	166	18	March 4, 2018	
**Dénis Bouanga**	November 11, 1994	FW	Gabon	2022–present	10	3	August 31, 2022	
Shaft Brewer Jr.	October 28, 1999	FW	United States	2018–2019	5	0	June 2, 2018	
Omar Campos	July 20, 2002	DF	Mexico	2024–2025	38	1	N/A	
Giorgio Chiellini	August 14, 1984	DF	Italy	2022–2023	45	1	July 17, 2022	
José Cifuentes	March 12, 1999	MF	Ecuador	2020–2023	120	15	March 1, 2020	
Laurent Ciman	August 5, 1985	DF	Belgium	2018	24	3	March 4, 2018	
Daniel Crisostomo	January 16, 1997	MF	United States	2021; 2022	12	0	August 15, 2021	
Adama Diomande	February 14, 1990	FW	Norway	2018–2020	52	24	May 26, 2018	
Erik Dueñas	October 18, 2004	MF	United States	2020–2024	48	0	October 14, 2020	
Bryce Duke	February 28, 2001	MF	United States	2020–2021	27	0	February 18, 2020	
Raheem Edwards	July 17, 1995	FW	Canada	2021	27	0	April 17, 2021	
Mohamed El Monir	April 8, 1992	DF	Libya	2019–2020	32	2	April 6, 2019	
Franco Escobar	February 21, 1995	DF	Argentina	2022	22	1	February 26, 2022	
Mamadou Fall	November 21, 2002	DF	Senegal	2021–2024	40	6	August 4, 2021	
Marco Farfan	November 12, 1998	DF	United States	2021	29	0	April 24, 2021	
Benny Feilhaber	January 19, 1985	MF	United States	2018	38	4	March 4, 2018	
Omar Gaber	January 30, 1992	DF	Egypt	2018	7	0	April 13, 2018	
Julian Gaines ‡	November 5, 2002	DF	United States	2021–2023	2	0	N/A	
Francisco Ginella	January 21, 1999	MF	Uruguay	2019–2024	46	1	February 18, 2020	
Alejandro Guido ‡	March 22, 1994	MF	United States	2019–2020	0	0	N/A	
Niko Hämäläinen	March 5, 1997	DF	Finland	2019	3	0	March 23, 2019	
Jordan Harvey	January 28, 1984	DF	United States	2018–2021	86	1	March 4, 2018	
Doneil Henry	April 20, 1993	DF	Canada	2022	6	0	September 26, 2022	
**Son Heung-min**	July 8, 1992	FW	South Korea	2025–present	28	14	N/A	
**Ryan Hollingshead**	April 16, 1991	DF	United States	2022–present	124	17	February 26, 2022	
André Horta	November 7, 1996	MF	Portugal	2018–2019	16	0	July 26, 2018	
Sebastien Ibeagha	January 21, 1992	DF	United States	2021–2022	36	0	August 15, 2021	
Dejan Jaković	July 16, 1985	DF	Canada	2018–2020	42	1	March 4, 2018	
Cal Jennings	May 17, 1997	FW	United States	2021–2022	22	1	April 24, 2021	
Mark-Anthony Kaye	December 2, 1994	MF	Canada	2018–2021	89	9	March 4, 2018	
Kim Moon-hwan	August 1, 1995	DF	South Korea	2021–2022	28	1	May 8, 2021	
Aaron Kovar	August 14, 1993	MF	United States	2018	15	0	March 10, 2018	
Tony Leone ‡	April 28, 2004	DF	United States	2020–2023	0	0	N/A	
Calum Mallace	January 10, 1990	MF	Scotland	2018	7	0	May 9, 2018	
Sebas Méndez	April 26, 1997	MF	Ecuador	2022	11	0	July 23, 2022	
João Moutinho	January 12, 1998	DF	Portugal	2018	15	1	March 4, 2018	
Jesús David Murillo	February 18, 1994	DF	Colombia	2020–2024	142	4	October 18, 2020	
James Murphy ‡	September 17, 1997	MF	United States	2018	0	0	N/A	
Danny Musovski	November 30, 1995	FW	United States	2020–2022	63	13	July 13, 2020	
Andy Najar	March 16, 1993	DF	Honduras	2020	8	0	July 23, 2020	
Michee Ngalina	October 13, 1995	FW	(Democratic Republic of the Congo) DR Congo	2021	2	0	September 29, 2021	
Kwadwo Opoku	July 13, 2001	FW	Ghana	2020–2023	78	13	October 11, 2020	
Rodrigo Pacheco	August 15, 1996	FW	Argentina	2018	1	0	April 7, 2018	
Diego Palacios	July 12, 1999	DF	Ecuador	2019–2023	131	1	September 29, 2019	
Adrien Perez	October 13, 1995	FW	United States	2019–2020	25	1	March 17, 2019	
Javi Pérez	March 29, 1996	MF	Spain	2019	1	0	March 23, 2019	
Joshua Pérez	January 21, 1998	FW	United States	2018–2019	16	1	September 29, 2018	
Alvaro Quezada	March 4, 1999	MF	United States	2021	1	0	August 4, 2021	
Christian Ramirez	April 4, 1991	FW	United States	2018–2019	28	7	August 11, 2018	
Brian Rodríguez	May 20, 2000	FW	Uruguay	2019–2022	65	9	August 25, 2019	
Diego Rossi	March 5, 1998	FW	Uruguay	2018–2022	121	59	March 4, 2018	
Steeve Saint-Duc ‡	January 8, 2000	FW	Haiti	2018	0	0	N/A	
Ilie Sánchez	November 21, 1990	MF	Spain	2022–2024	92	2	February 26, 2022	
Mark Segbers ‡	April 18, 1996	DF	United States	2020	0	0	N/A	
**Eddie Segura**	February 2, 1997	DF	Colombia	2019–present	100	3	March 3, 2019	
Danilo Silva	November 24, 1986	DF	Brazil	2018–2020	19	1	August 5, 2018	
Ismael Tajouri-Shradi	March 28, 1994	FW	Libya	2022	6	2	March 12, 2022	
Cristian Tello	August 11, 1991	FW	Spain	2022	6	0	September 13, 2022	
Christian Torres	April 15, 2003	FW	Mexico	2020–2023	11	1	August 30, 2020	
Mohamed Traore	August 15, 2002	DF	Senegal	2020–2023	1	0	September 9, 2020	
Danny Trejo	April 29, 1998	MF	Mexico	2022	3	0	June 18, 2022	
Marco Ureña	March 5, 1990	FW	Costa Rica	2018	19	2	March 4, 2018	
Peter-Lee Vassell	February 3, 1998	MF	Jamaica	2019	6	0	March 3, 2019	
Carlos Vela	March 1, 1989	FW	Mexico	2018–2024	187	93	March 4, 2018	
Bradley Wright-Phillips	March 12, 1985	FW	England	2020	21	9	July 13, 2020	
Rodolfo Zelaya	July 3, 1988	FW	El Salvador	2019	5	1	June 11, 2019	
Walker Zimmerman	May 19, 1993	DF	United States	2018–2019	59	5	March 4, 2018	

=== Goalkeepers ===
Name	D.O.B.	Pos	Nationality	Years	Games	Conceded	Shutouts	Debut	Ref
Jamal Blackman	October 27, 1993	GK	England	2021	8	13	1	September 29, 2021	
Maxime Crépeau	May 11, 1994	GK	Canada	2022–2023	51	43	11	February 26, 2022	
Phillip Ejimadu ‡	August 31, 1999	GK	United States	2019–2020	0	0	0	N/A	
**Hugo Lloris**	December 26, 1986	GK	France	2024–present	106			N/A	
Luis López	September 13, 1993	GK	Honduras	2018	1	2	0	August 11, 2018	
Charlie Lyon ‡	April 10, 1992	GK	United States	2018	0	0	0	N/A	
John McCarthy	July 4, 1992	GK	United States	2022–2023	39	4	1	April 20, 2022	
Tyler Miller	March 12, 1993	GK	United States	2018–2019	68	94	20	March 4, 2018	
**David Ochoa**	January 16, 2001	GK	Mexico	2024–present	2			N/A	
Greg Ranjitsingh ‡	July 18, 1993	GK	Trinidad and Tobago	2021	0	0	0	N/A	
Quillan Roberts ‡	September 13, 1994	GK	Guyana	2018	0	0	0	N/A	
Tomas Romero	December 19, 2000	GK	El Salvador	2021–2022	18	28	4	June 23, 2021	
Pablo Sisniega	July 7, 1995	GK	Mexico	2019–2021	32	47	4	June 11, 2019	
Kenneth Vermeer	January 10, 1986	GK	Netherlands	2020–2021	15	24	2	February 18, 2020	

== By nationality ==
MLS regulations allow for eight international roster slots per team to be used on non-domestic players. However, this limit can be exceeded by trading international slots with another MLS team. Overseas players are exempt from counting towards this total if they have permanent residency rights in the U.S. (green card holder), other special dispensation such as refugee or asylum status, or qualify under the Homegrown International Rule. In total, 75 players representing 30 countries have played for LAFC.

Note: Countries indicate national team as defined under FIFA eligibility rules. Players may hold more than one non-FIFA nationality.

Country	Total players
Argentina	2
Belgium	1
Brazil	1
Canada	5
DR Congo	1
Colombia	5
Costa Rica	1
Ecuador	2
Egypt	1
El Salvador	2
England	2
Finland	1
France	1
Gabon	1
Ghana	2
Honduras	2
Italy	1
Iran	1
Jamaica	1
Libya	2
Mexico	6
Netherlands	1
Norway	1
Portugal	2
Scotland	1
Senegal	2
South Korea	2
Spain	3
United States	23
Uruguay	3
Wales	1

== Sources ==
- By Season | MLSsoccer.com
