= List of Los Angeles FC records and statistics =

Los Angeles FC is an American professional soccer team based in Los Angeles, California, that competes in Major League Soccer (MLS).

This is a list of franchise records for Los Angeles, which dates from their inaugural season in 2018 to present.

== Honors ==
Continental
Competitions	Titles	Seasons	Runner-up
CONCACAF Champions League	0		2020, 2023
Campeones Cup	0		2023
Leagues Cup	0		2024
National
Competitions	Titles	Seasons	Runner-up
MLS Cup	1	2022	2023
Supporters' Shield	2	2019, 2022	
U.S. Open Cup	1	2024	

== Player records ==
=== Most appearances ===
Place	Name	Period	MLS	Playoffs	Open Cup	Continental	Other (Note: Includes knockout round games of the MLS is Back Tournament)	Total
1	**(Mexico)** Carlos Vela	2018–2023	152	12	8	16	0	188
2	(Ghana) Latif Blessing	2018–2023	142	4	10	6	5	167
3	(Ecuador) Diego Palacios	2020–2023	99	8	3	17	5	132
4	(Uruguay) Diego Rossi	2018–2021	101	3	7	5	5	121
4	(Ecuador) José Cifuentes	2020–2023	99	3	3	11	5	121
5	(Colombia) **Eduard Atuesta**	2018–2021, 2024–present	93	4	6	3	5	111
6	(Colombia) **Jesús Murillo**	2020–present	85	9	1	13	0	108
7	(Colombia) **Eddie Segura**	2019–present	82	4	3	6	5	100
8	(Spain) **Ilie Sánchez**	2022–present	67	8	2	13	0	90
9	(Canada) Mark-Anthony Kaye	2018–2021	77	2	3	5	2	89
10	(United States) Jordan Harvey	2018–2021	74	4	6	0	2	86

As of through the end of 2023 MLS season

Bolded players are currently on the LAFC roster.

=== Goals ===
Place	Name	Period	MLS	Playoffs	Open Cup	Continental	Other (Note: Includes knockout round games of the MLS is Back Tournament)	Total
1	(Mexico) Carlos Vela	2018–2023	78	2	3	10	0	93
2	(Uruguay) Diego Rossi	2018–2021	43	1	6	2	7	59
3	**(Gabon) Denis Bouanga**	2022–present	21	7	0	13	0	41
4	(Colombia) Cristian Arango	2021–2022	30	2	3	0	0	35
5	(Norway) Adama Diomande	2018–2020	20	2	2	0	0	24
6	(Ghana) Latif Blessing	2018–2023	14	0	2	1	1	18
7	(Ecuador) José Cifuentes	2020–2023	14	0	0	1	0	15
8	**(United States) Ryan Hollingshead**	2022–present	10	3	1	1	0	14
9	(United States) Danny Musovski	2020–2022	11	0	2	0	0	13
9	(Ghana) Kwadwo Opoku	2020–2023	9	1	0	3	0	13

As of through the end of 2023 MLS season

Bolded players are currently on the LAFC roster.

=== Most Assists ===
Place	Name	Period	MLS	Playoffs	Open Cup	Continental	Other (Note: Includes knockout round games of the MLS is Back Tournament)	Total
1	(Mexico) Carlos Vela	2018–2023	42	7	2	3	0	54
2	(Colombia) **Eduard Atuesta**	2019–2021, 2024–present	19	0	2	1	1	23
3	(Uruguay) Diego Rossi	2018–2021	17	2	1	0	2	22
4	(Ecuador) José Cifuentes	2020–2023	17	0	2	1	0	20
5	(Ghana) Latif Blessing	2018–2023	14	0	2	0	2	18
6	(Canada) Mark-Anthony Kaye	2018–2021	16	0	0	1	0	17
7	**(Gabon) Denis Bouanga**	2022–present	8	0	0	7	0	15
8	(Uruguay) Brian Rodríguez	2019–2022	10	1	0	0	3	14
9	(Ecuador) Diego Palacios	2020–2023	8	2	1	2	0	13
10	(United States) Lee Nguyen	2018–2019	7	1	3	0	0	11

As of through the end of 2023 MLS season

Bolded players are currently on the LAFC roster.

=== Most shutouts ===
Place	Name	Period	MLS	Playoffs	Open Cup	Continental	Other (Note: Includes knockout round games of the MLS is Back Tournament)	Total
1	(United States) Tyler Miller	2018–2019	19	0	1	0	0	20
2	(Canada) Maxime Crépeau	2022–2023	11	4	1	0	0	16
3	(Canada) John McCarthy	2022–2023	8	0	0	5	0	13
4	(Mexico) Pablo Sisniega	2019–2021	3	0	1	0	0	4
4	(El Salvador) Tomas Romero	2022–2022	4	0	0	0	0	4
6	(Netherlands) Kenneth Vermeer	2020	1	0	0	1	0	2
7	(England) Jamal Blackman	2021	1	0	0	0	0	1

As of through the end of 2023 MLS season

Bolded players are currently on the LAFC roster.

== Coaching records ==
As of through the end of 2023 MLS season

Coach	From	To	Record				
Coach	From	To	G	W	D	L	Win %
(United States) Bob Bradley	July 27, 2017	November 18, 2021	142	68	34	40	59.86
(United States) Steve Cherundolo	January 3, 2022	present	93	50	15	28	61.83

== International results ==
=== By competition ===
As of December 22, 2020 (Includes CONCACAF Champions League)

Competition	Pld	W	D	L	GF	GA	GD	W%
CONCACAF Champions Cup	18	10	1	7	32	19	+13	52.63
Leagues Cup	11	7	2	2	32	10	+22	63.64
Friendlies	3	2	1	0	7	2	+5	83.33
Total	23	12	1	9	39	21	+18	52.17

=== By club ===
As of June 20, 2025 (Includes CONCACAF Champions League)

Club	Pld	W	D	L	GF	GA	GD
(Mexico) América	4	3	1	0	7	3	+4
(Mexico) Cruz Azul	1	1	0	0	2	1	+1
(Mexico) FC Juárez	1	1	0	0	7	1	+6
(Mexico) León	4	1	0	3	4	5	–1
(Mexico) CF Monterrey	1	0	0	1	2	3	–1
(Mexico) Tigres UANL	3	1	1	1	3	3	0
(Mexico) Tijuana	1	1	0	0	3	0	+3
(Germany) BVB Dortmund	1	0	1	0	1	1	0
(Japan) Vissel Kobe	1	1	0	0	4	1	+3
(Uruguay) Peñarol	1	1	0	0	2	0	+2
(Costa Rica) Alajuelense	2	1	1	0	4	2	2
(England) Chelsea	1	0	0	1	0	2	–2
(Tunisia) Espérance de Tunis	1	0	0	1	0	1	–1

=== By country and league ===
As of December 22, 2020 (Includes CONCACAF Champions League)

Country & League	Pld	W	D	L	GF	GA	GD
Mexico - Liga MX	6	3	1	2	9	6	+3
Germany - Bundesliga	1	0	1	0	1	1	0
Japan - J1 League	1	1	0	0	4	1	+3
Uruguay - Uruguayan Primera	1	1	0	0	2	0	+2
Costa Rica - Liga FPD	0	0	0	0	0	0	0

=== By season ===
Competition	Season	Round	Opposition	Home	Away	Aggregate
Friendly	2018	-	(Germany) BVB Dortmund	1-1		
Friendly	2019	-	(Japan) Vissel Kobe	4-1		
Friendly	2020	-	(Uruguay) Peñarol	2–0		
Friendly	2025	-	(Mexico) América	2–1		
FIFA Club World Cup	2025	Qualifiers	(Mexico) América	2–1		
FIFA Club World Cup	2025	Group Stage	(England) Chelsea	0–2		
FIFA Club World Cup	2025	Group Stage	(Tunisia) ES Tunis	0–1		
FIFA Club World Cup	2025	Group Stage	(Brazil) Flamengo	1–1		
CONCACAF Champions Cup	2020	Round of 16	(Mexico) León	3–0	0–2	3–2
CONCACAF Champions Cup	2020	Quarter-finals	(Mexico) Cruz Azul	2–1		
CONCACAF Champions Cup	2020	Semi-finals	(Mexico) América	3–1		
CONCACAF Champions Cup	2020	Final	(Mexico) Tigres UANL	1–2		
CONCACAF Champions Cup	2023	Round of 16	(Costa Rica) Alajuelense	1–2	3–0	4–2
CONCACAF Champions Cup	2023	Quarter-finals	(Canada) Vancouver Whitecaps FC	3–0	3–0	6–0
CONCACAF Champions Cup	2023	Semi-finals	(United States) Philadelphia Union	3–0	1-1	4–1
CONCACAF Champions Cup	2023	Final	(Mexico) León	0–1	1–2	1–3
CONCACAF Champions Cup	2025	Round One	(United States) Colorado Rapids	1–0	1–2	2-2 (a)
CONCACAF Champions Cup	2025	Round of 16	(United States) Columbus Crew	3–0	1–2	4–2
CONCACAF Champions Cup	2025	Quarter-finals	(United States) Inter Miami	1–0	1–3	2–3
Leagues Cup	2022	Showcase	(Mexico) América	0–0 (5-6 p)		
Leagues Cup	2023	Round of 32	(Mexico) Juárez	7–1		
Leagues Cup	2023	Round of 16	(United States) Real Salt Lake	4–0		
Leagues Cup	2023	Quarter-finals	(Mexico) Monterrey	2–3		
Leagues Cup	2024	Group stage	(Mexico) Tijuana	3–0		
Leagues Cup	2024	Group stage	(Canada) Vancouver Whitecaps FC	2–2 (2-4 p)		
Leagues Cup	2024	Round of 32	(United States) Austin FC	2–0		
Leagues Cup	2024	Round of 16	(United States) San Jose Earthquakes	4–1		
Leagues Cup	2024	Quarter-finals	(United States) Seattle Sounders FC	3–0		
Leagues Cup	2024	Semi-finals	(United States) Colorado Rapids	4–0		
Leagues Cup	2024	Final	(United States) Colombus Crew	1–3		
Leagues Cup	2025	Group stage	(Mexico) Mazatlán	1-1 (10-11 p)		
Leagues Cup	2025	Group stage	(Mexico) Pachuca	1-1 (4-2 p)		
Leagues Cup	2025	Group stage	(Mexico) UANL	–		
Campeones Cup	2023	Final	(Mexico) UANL	0–0 (2-4 p)		

== Transfers ==
As per MLS rules and regulations; some transfer fees have been undisclosed and are not included in the tables below.

=== Highest transfer fees paid ===
	Player	From	Fee	Date
1.	(Uruguay) Brian Rodríguez	(Uruguay) Peñarol	$11.7 million	August 2019
2.	(Portugal) André Horta	(Portugal) Benfica	$7 million	March 2018
3.	(Mexico) Carlos Vela	(Spain) Real Sociedad	$6.1 million	August 2017
4.	(Uruguay) Diego Rossi	(Uruguay) Peñarol	$3.9 million	December 2017
5.	(Colombia) Cristian Arango	(Colombia) Millonarios FC	$2.5 million	August 2021

=== Highest transfer fees received ===
	Player	To	Fee	Date
1.	(Uruguay) Brian Rodriguez	(Mexico) Club América	$6 million	August 2022
2.	(Uruguay) Diego Rossi	(Turkey) Fenerbahçe	$6 million	April 2022
3.	(Colombia) Eduard Atuesta	(Brazil) Palmeiras	$4 million	January 2022
4.	(Portugal) André Horta	(Portugal) Braga	$2.75 million	June 2019
5.	(United States) Walker Zimmerman	(United States) Nashville SC	$1.25 million	February 2020
