= Rodrigo Pacheco =

Rodrigo Pacheco may refer to:

- Rodrigo Pacheco, 3rd Marquess of Cerralvo (1565-1652), Spanish nobleman
- Rodrigo Pacheco (politician) (born 1976), Brazilian politician and lawyer
- Rodrigo Pacheco (badminton) (born 1983), Peruvian badminton player
- Rodrigo Pacheco (footballer) (born 1996), Argentine footballer
- Rodrigo Pacheco Méndez (born 2005), Mexican tennis player
