= 2020 Los Angeles FC season =

LAFC
2020 season
- General manager: John Thorrington
- Head coach: Bob Bradley
- Stadium: Banc of California Stadium
- MLS: Conference: 7th Overall: 12th
- MLS Cup Playoffs: First round
- U.S. Open Cup: Canceled
- CONCACAF Champions League: Runners-up
- MLS is Back Tournament: Quarter-finals
- Top goalscorer: League: Diego Rossi (14); All: Diego Rossi (18)
- Highest home attendance: 22,121
- Lowest home attendance: 0 (multiple closed door games)
- Average home league attendance: 22,051
- Biggest win: 6–0 (Sept. 23 vs. Vancouver)
- Biggest defeat: 0–3 (Sept. 6 at LA Galaxy) (Sept. 9 at Real Salt Lake) (Sept. 18 at Seattle)
Home colors	Away colors

The 2020 Los Angeles FC season was the club's third season in Major League Soccer, the top tier of the American soccer pyramid. Los Angeles FC played their home matches at the Banc of California Stadium in the Exposition Park neighborhood of Los Angeles. Outside of MLS play, the team planned to participate in the 2020 U.S. Open Cup tournament (before the tournament's cancelation due to the COVID-19 pandemic) and qualified for the 2020 CONCACAF Champions League, reaching the final.

== Squad ==
=== First-team roster ===
As of November 8, 2020.

No.	Name	Nationality	Pos	Date of birth (age)	Apps	Goals
1	Kenneth Vermeer (INTL)	Netherlands	GK	January 10, 1986 (age 40)	8	0
23	Pablo Sisniega	Mexico	GK	July 7, 1995 (age 30)	14	0
40	Phillip Ejimadu	United States	GK	August 31, 1999 (age 26)	0	0
2	Jordan Harvey	United States	DF	January 28, 1984 (age 42)	12	0
3	Mohamed Traore	Senegal	DF	August 15, 2002 (age 23)	1	0
4	Eddie Segura (INTL)	Colombia	DF	February 2, 1997 (age 29)	22	2
12	Diego Palacios (INTL)	Ecuador	DF	July 12, 1999 (age 26)	17	0
18	Erik Dueñas (HG)	United States	DF	October 18, 2004 (age 21)	2	0
28	Tony Leone (HG)	United States	DF	April 28, 2004 (age 21)	0	0
13	Mohamed El Monir (INTL)	Libya	DF	April 8, 1992 (age 33)	13	1
43	Mark Segbers	United States	DF	April 18, 1996 (age 29)	0	0
27	Tristan Blackmon	United States	DF	August 12, 1996 (age 29)	14	0
5	Dejan Jaković	Canada	DF	July 16, 1985 (age 40)	14	1
94	Jesús David Murillo	Colombia	DF	February 18, 1994 (age 32)	5	0
8	Francisco Ginella (INTL)	Uruguay	MF	January 21, 1999 (age 27)	22	1
7	Latif Blessing	Ghana	MF	December 30, 1996 (age 29)	21	1
14	Mark-Anthony Kaye	Canada	MF	December 2, 1994 (age 31)	16	3
15	Alejandro Guido	United States	MF	March 22, 1994 (age 31)	0	0
20	Eduard Atuesta	Colombia	MF	June 18, 1997 (age 28)	17	1
11	José Cifuentes (INTL)	Ecuador	MF	March 12, 1999 (age 26)	18	1
19	Bryce Duke (HG)	United States	MF	February 28, 2001 (age 25)	11	0
16	Danny Musovski	United States	FW	November 30, 1995 (age 30)	15	5
9	Diego Rossi (DP)	Uruguay	FW	March 5, 1998 (age 28)	19	14
10	Carlos Vela (DP)	Mexico	FW	March 1, 1989 (age 37)	7	4
17	Brian Rodríguez (DP, INTL)	Uruguay	FW	May 20, 2000 (age 25)	19	2
26	Adrien Perez	United States	FW	October 13, 1995 (age 30)	10	0
66	Bradley Wright-Phillips	England	FW	March 12, 1985 (age 40)	18	8
24	Andy Najar	Honduras	DF	March 16, 1993 (age 32)	8	0
21	Christian Torres (HG)	United States	FW	April 15, 2004 (age 21)	9	1
22	Kwadwo Opoku	Ghana	FW	July 13, 2001 (age 24)	3	0

== Transfers ==
=== Transfers in ===
Entry date	Position	Player	From club	Notes	Ref.
December 10, 2019	FW	(United States) Danny Musovski	(United States) Reno 1868 FC	Transfer	
December 16, 2019	MF	(Uruguay) Francisco Ginella	(Uruguay) Montevideo Wanderers	Transfer	
January 13, 2020	MF	(Ecuador) José Cifuentes	(Ecuador) América de Quito	Transfer, $100,000 in GAM paid to (United States) Orlando City SC for player rights	
January 15, 2020	GK	(Netherlands) Kenneth Vermeer	(Netherlands) Feyenoord	Transfer	
January 25, 2020	MF	(United States) Bryce Duke	(United States) Real Salt Lake	Transfer for $50,000 in GAM for 2021 for Homegrown rights	
February 14, 2020	FW	(England) Bradley Wright-Phillips	(United States) New York Red Bulls	Free Agent	
July 8, 2020	FW	(United States) Christian Torres	(United States) LAFC Academy	Homegrown Signing	
July 8, 2020	MF	(United States) Erik Dueñas	(United States) LAFC Academy	Homegrown Signing	
July 8, 2020	DF	(United States) (Mexico) Tony Leone	(United States) LAFC Academy	Homegrown Signing	
October 13, 2020	DF	(United States) Mark Segbers	(United States) Memphis 901 FC	Loan	
October 14, 2020	DF	(Colombia) Jesús David Murillo	(Colombia) Independiente Medellín	Loan	

=== Transfers out ===
Exit date	Position	Player	To club	Notes	Ref.
November 21, 2019	DF	(United States) Lamar Batista	(United States) North Texas SC	Option declined	
November 21, 2019	DF	(Iran) Steven Beitashour	(United States) Colorado Rapids	Contract not renewed	
November 21, 2019	GK	(United States) Phillip Ejimadu	(Brazil) Nacional	Loan Ended	
November 21, 2019	MF	(Spain) Javier Pérez		Option declined	
November 21, 2019	MF	(Jamaica) Peter-Lee Vassell		Option declined	
January 7, 2020	FW	(El Salvador) Rodolfo Zelaya	(Mexico) Celaya	Mutually agreed to part ways	
January 16, 2020	GK	(United States) Tyler Miller	(United States) Minnesota United FC	Traded for $150,000 in GAM in 2020 and $50,000 in TAM in 2021	
February 7, 2020	FW	(United States) Joshua Perez		Mutually agreed to part ways	
February 11, 2020	DF	(United States) Walker Zimmerman	(United States) Nashville SC	Traded for $600,000 in GAM in 2020 and $350,000 in GAM in 2021, and up to $150,000 each in 2020 and 2021 based on appearances	
August 13, 2020	FW	(Norway) Adama Diomande		Mutually agreed to part ways	
September 1, 2020	MF	(United States) Alejandro Guido	(United States) San Diego Loyal SC	Loan	
September 23, 2020	DF	(Brazil) Danilo Silva		Retired	
September 23, 2020	GK	(United States) Phillip Ejimadu	(United States) San Diego Loyal SC	Loan	
December 23, 2020	FW	(England) Bradley Wright-Phillips	(United States) Columbus Crew SC	Free agent	

=== Draft picks ===
Round	#	Position	Player	College/Club Team	Reference
1	24	GK	(Brazil) Paulo Pita	Marshall	
2	50	MF	(Republic of Ireland) Jack Hallahan	Michigan	
3	76	MF	(Spain) Jorge Gonzalez	SIUE	
4	102	DF	(Morocco) Younes Boudadi	Creighton	

== Competitions ==
Win Draw Loss

=== Exhibitions ===
January 25 Preseason 1	Los Angeles FC	2–0	Peñarol	Los Angeles
7:30 PM	Vela 10'; A. Perez 40'	Report; Report		Stadium: Banc of California Stadium; Attendance: 16,292

January 31 Preseason 2	Los Angeles FC	3–1	New York City FC	Los Angeles
12:00 PM	Rodríguez 23'; A. Perez 31'; Gonzalez 60'	Report	De Rosario 73'	Stadium: Banc of California Stadium; Attendance: Closed door

February 6 Preseason 3	Los Angeles FC	2–2	FC Dallas	Los Angeles
1:00 PM	Rodríguez 30' (o.g.)	Report	Ferreira 45'; Pepi	Stadium: Banc of California Stadium
Note: Played in three 30-minute periods.

February 12 Preseason 4	Los Angeles FC	3–1	Toronto FC	Los Angeles
12:00 PM	Rodríguez 20'; Vela 74'; Torres 81'	Report; Report	Achara 51'	Stadium: Banc of California Stadium

=== Major League Soccer ===
==== Standings ====
===== Western Conference =====
Pos	Team	Pld	W	L	T	GF	GA	GD	Pts	PPG	Qualification
5	Colorado Rapids	18	8	6	4	32	28	+4	28	1.56	MLS Cup First Round
6	FC Dallas	22	9	6	7	28	24	+4	34	1.55	MLS Cup First Round
7	Los Angeles FC	22	9	8	5	47	39	+8	32	1.45	MLS Cup First Round
8	San Jose Earthquakes	23	8	9	6	35	51	−16	30	1.30	MLS Cup First Round
9	Vancouver Whitecaps FC	23	9	14	0	27	44	−17	27	1.17	

Source: MLS
Rules for classification: 1) points per game; 2) total wins per match played; 3) total goal differential per match played; 4) total goals scored per match played; 5) fewest disciplinary points per match played; 6) away goal differential per away match played; 7) away goals scored per away match played; 8) home goal differential per home match played; 9) home goals scored per home match played; 10) coin toss or drawing of lots.

===== MLS is Back – Group F =====
Group F results
Pos	Team	Pld	W	D	L	GF	GA	GD	Pts	Qualification
1	Portland Timbers	3	2	1	0	6	4	+2	7	Advanced to knockout stage
2	Los Angeles FC	3	1	2	0	11	7	+4	5	Advanced to knockout stage
3	Houston Dynamo	3	0	2	1	5	6	−1	2	
4	LA Galaxy	3	0	1	2	4	9	−5	1	

Source: MLS

===== Overall =====
2020 MLS overall standings
Pos	Team	Pld	W	L	T	GF	GA	GD	Pts	PPG
10	Colorado Rapids	18	8	6	4	32	28	+4	28	1.56
11	FC Dallas	22	9	6	7	28	24	+4	34	1.55
12	Los Angeles FC	22	9	8	5	47	39	+8	32	1.45
13	New York Red Bulls	23	9	9	5	29	31	−2	32	1.39
14	Nashville SC	23	8	7	8	24	22	+2	32	1.39

Source: MLS
Rules for classification: 1) points per game; 2) total wins per match played; 3) total goal differential per match played; 4) total goals scored per match played; 5) fewest disciplinary points per match played; 6) away goal differential per away match played; 7) away goals scored per away match played; 8) home goal differential per home match played; 9) home goals scored per home match played; 10) coin toss or drawing of lots.

==== Results ====
All times are Pacific.

March 1 1	Los Angeles FC	1–0	Inter Miami CF	Los Angeles
2:30 PM PDT	Vela 44'; Atuesta (yellow card) 60'; Harvey (yellow card) 81'	Report	Ulloa (yellow card) 63'; Powell (yellow card) 66'; Agudelo (yellow card) 83'	Stadium: Banc of California Stadium; Attendance: 22,121; Referee: Allen Chapman

March 8 2	Los Angeles FC	3–3	Philadelphia Union	Los Angeles
7:30 PM PDT	Vela 38'; Palacios (yellow card) 45+2'; Rossi 49'; Segura 71'	Report	Santos 29'; Gaddis (yellow card) 33'; Martínez (yellow card) 43'; Bedoya (yellow card) 45+4'; Glesnes 48'; Aaronson 69'; Fontana (yellow card) 90+6'	Stadium: Banc of California Stadium; Attendance: 22,112; Referee: Chris Penso

July 13 3 MLSiBT Group stage	Los Angeles FC	3–3	Houston Dynamo	Bay Lake, Florida
5:30 PM PDT	Wright-Phillips 19'; Blackmon (yellow card) 52'; Rossi 63'; Rodríguez 69'	Report	Rodríguez 9', 30'; Elis 45+5'; Vera (yellow card) 46'; García (yellow card) 67'	Stadium: ESPN Wide World of Sports Complex; Attendance: 0 Referee: Tim Ford

July 18 4 MLSiBT Group stage	Los Angeles FC	6–2	LA Galaxy	Bay Lake, Florida
7:30 PM PDT	Rossi 13' (pen.), 45+2', 75', 90+2'; Jakovic (yellow card) 28'; Sisniega (yellow card) 31'; Wright-Phillips 56'; Atuesta (yellow card) 65'; El Monir 80'	Report	Blessing 5' (o.g.); Insúa (yellow card) 16'; Pavón 31' (pen.); Cuello (yellow card) 39'; Feltscher (yellow card) 45'; Kitchen (yellow card) 52'	Stadium: ESPN Wide World of Sports Complex; Attendance: 0 Referee: Allen Chapman

July 23 5 MLSiBT Group stage	Los Angeles FC	2–2	Portland Timbers	Bay Lake, Florida
7:30 PM PDT	Wright-Phillips 36'; Kaye 40'; Atuesta (yellow card) 60'	Report	Niezgoda 7'; Duvall (yellow card) 29'; Blanco (yellow card) 54'; Paredes (yellow card) 65'; Ebobisse 81'	Stadium: ESPN Wide World of Sports Complex; Attendance: 0 Referee: Drew Fischer

August 22 6	Los Angeles FC	0–2	LA Galaxy	Los Angeles
3:00 PM PDT	Blackmon (yellow card) 51'; El Monir (yellow card) 90'	Report	Zubak 26'; Lletget 54'; Kitchen (yellow card) 66'	Stadium: Banc of California Stadium; Attendance: 0 Referee: Ismail Elfath

August 30 7	Seattle Sounders FC	3–1	Los Angeles FC	Seattle, Washington
7:00 PM PDT	Ruidíaz 11'; Morris 48', 49'; Leerdam (yellow card) 28'; O'Neill (yellow card) 64'	Report	Rossi 60'; Kaye (yellow card) 42'; Blessing (yellow card) 69'	Stadium: CenturyLink Field; Attendance: 0 Referee: Kevin Stott

September 2 8	Los Angeles FC	5–1	San Jose Earthquakes	Los Angeles
8:00 PM PDT	Rossi 21', 69'; Palacios (yellow card) 33'; Wright-Phillips 49'; Cifuentes 64'; Musovski 83'	Report	Hoesen 90+2'	Stadium: Banc of California Stadium; Attendance: 0 Referee: Alex Chilowicz
Note: Match originally scheduled to kick-off at 7:30 PDT

September 6 9	LA Galaxy	3–0	Los Angeles FC	Carson, California
7:30 PDT	Kitchen (yellow card) 22'; Pavón 51'; Lletget 73', 83'	Report	Blessing (yellow card) 19'; Kaye (red card) 53'	Stadium: Dignity Health Sports Park; Attendance: 0 Referee: Allen Chapman

September 9 10	Real Salt Lake	3–0	Los Angeles FC	Sandy, Utah
6:30 PDT	Kreilach 9', (yellow card) 48'; Meram 47'; Ruíz (yellow card) 61'; Glad (yellow card) 70'; Rusnák 79' (pen.); Beckerman (yellow card) 85'	Report	Cifuentes (yellow card) 65'; Harvey (yellow card) 78'	Stadium: Rio Tinto Stadium; Attendance: 5,000; Referee: Victor Rivas
Note: Match was originally scheduled for August 26.

September 13 11	Los Angeles FC	4–2	Portland Timbers	Los Angeles
8:00 PM PDT	Kaye 37'; Rossi 41'; Wright-Phillips 45+1'; Musovski 90+5'; Cifuentes (yellow card) 83'	Report	Williamson 25'; Ebobisse 45+2'; Bonilla (yellow card) 71'	Stadium: Banc of California Stadium; Attendance: 0 Referee: Jair Marrufo

September 18 12	Seattle Sounders FC	3–0	Los Angeles FC	Seattle, Washington
7:00 PM PDT	Lodeiro 29' (pen.), 33' (pen.), (yellow card) 71'; Arreaga (yellow card) 63'; Ruidíaz 82'; Gómez Andrade (yellow card) 84'	Report	Cifuentes (yellow card) 54'; Najar (yellow card) 90+4'	Stadium: CenturyLink Field; Attendance: 0 Referee: Joseph Dickerson

September 23 13	Los Angeles FC	6–0	Vancouver Whitecaps FC	Los Angeles
7:30 PDT	Jakovic 2'; Wright-Phillips 5', 11'; Veselinović 14' (o.g.); Rossi 33'; Rose 68' (o.g.); Harvey (yellow card) 83'	Report	Baldisimo (yellow card) 27'	Stadium: Banc of California Stadium; Attendance: 0 Referee: Rubiel Vazquez

September 27 14	Los Angeles FC	1–2	San Jose Earthquakes	Los Angeles
7:30 PDT	Kaye 45'; Ginella (yellow card) 90+3'	Report	Ríos (yellow card) 34'; Salinas (yellow card) 75', (goal) 80'; Espinoza (yellow card) 83'; Yueill 90+3'	Stadium: Banc of California Stadium; Attendance: 0 Referee: Ismail Elfath

October 4 15	Real Salt Lake	1–3	Los Angeles FC	Sandy, Utah
6:30 PM PDT	Ruíz (yellow card) 60'; Atuesta 64' (o.g.); Johnson (yellow card) 71'; Toia (yellow card) 80'	Report	Wright-Phillips 22'; Rossi 27'; Rodríguez 59'	Stadium: Rio Tinto Stadium; Attendance: 3,062; Referee: Nima Saghafi

October 7 16	Colorado Rapids	Canceled	Los Angeles FC	Commerce City, Colorado
6:00 PM PDT				Stadium: Dick's Sporting Goods Park
Note: Match was postponed and later canceled after a staff member from the Colorado Rapids tested positive for COVID-19.

October 11 17	Los Angeles FC	3–1	Seattle Sounders FC	Los Angeles
4:00 PM PDT	Musovski 15', 84'; Ginella (yellow card) 19', (goal) 65'; El Monir (yellow card) 88'	Report	Lodeiro (yellow card) 74', (goal) 77'; João Paulo (yellow card) 80'	Stadium: Banc of California Stadium; Attendance: 0 Referee: Ramy Touchan

October 14 18	Vancouver Whitecaps FC	2–1	Los Angeles FC	Portland, Oregon
7:00 PM PDT	Cavallini 30', 59'; Bush (yellow card) 83'; Bikel (yellow card) 89'	Report	Segura (yellow card) 49'; Atuesta 83' (pen.); Dueñas (yellow card) 90+3'	Stadium: Providence Park; Attendance: 0 Referee: Tori Penso
Note: Match was played in Portland due to Canadian travel restrictions during the COVID-19 pandemic

October 18 19	Portland Timbers	1–1	Los Angeles FC	Portland, Oregon
7:00 PM PDT	D. Chará (yellow card) 12'; Williamson (yellow card) 29'; Ebobisse 47'	Report	Harvey (yellow card) 5'; Segura (yellow card) 49'; Jakovic (yellow card) 77'; Torres 90+3'; Opoku (yellow card) 90+6'	Stadium: Providence Park; Attendance: 0 Referee: Allen Chapman

October 25 20	Los Angeles FC	2–0	LA Galaxy	Los Angeles
12:30 PDT	Musovski 58'; Vela 90+3'	Report	González (red card) 25'; DePuy (yellow card) 75'	Stadium: Banc of California Stadium; Attendance: 0 Referee: Kevin Stott

October 28 21	Los Angeles FC	2–1	Houston Dynamo	Los Angeles
7:30 PM PDT	Rossi 9'; Segura 22', (yellow card) 32'; Cifuentes (yellow card) 84'; Blessing (yellow card) 85'	Report	Lassiter 46'; Vera (yellow card) 33' (yellow-red card) 59'; Quintero (yellow card) 72'; Garcia (yellow card) 90'	Stadium: Banc of California Stadium; Attendance: 0 Referee: Ramy Touchan

November 4 22	San Jose Earthquakes	3–2	Los Angeles FC	San Jose, California
8:00 PM PST	Ríos (yellow card) 21'; Atuesta 28' (o.g.); Wondolowski 37'; Yueill (yellow card) 51' (yellow-red card) 61'; Espinoza 72'	Report	Blessing 23'; Ginella (yellow card) 33'; Murillo (yellow card) 66'; Rossi 90+5'	Stadium: Earthquakes Stadium; Referee: Timothy Ford
Note: Match was postponed from November 1 after 3 players from LAFC tested positive for COVID-19.

November 8 23	Los Angeles FC	1–1	Portland Timbers	Los Angeles
3:30 PM PST	Vela 5'; Blessing (yellow card) 27'; Torres (yellow card) 63'	Report	Valeri (yellow card) 31'; Asprilla (yellow card) 81'; Villafaña 90'; Mabiala (yellow card) 90+2'	Stadium: Banc of California Stadium; Attendance: 0 Referee: Alan Kelly

=== MLS is Back Tournament ===
July 27 Round of 16	Seattle Sounders FC	1–4	Los Angeles FC	Bay Lake, Florida
8:00 PM PDT	Bruin 75'	Report	Rossi 14' (pen.), 82'; Blessing 39'; Rodríguez 89'	Stadium: ESPN Wide World of Sports Complex; Attendance: 0 Referee: Jair Marrufo

July 31 Quarter-finals	Orlando City SC	1–1 (5–4 p)	Los Angeles FC	Bay Lake, Florida
4:30 PM PDT	Ruan (yellow card) 9'; Pereyra (yellow card) 48'; Perea (yellow card) 86'; Moutinho 90'	Report	Palacios (yellow card) 8'; Wright-Phillips 60'	Stadium: ESPN Wide World of Sports Complex; Attendance: 0 Referee: Joseph Dickerson
	Penalties
	Pereyra (penalty scored); Smith (penalty scored); Moutinho (penalty scored); Carlos (penalty scored); Nani (penalty scored)		(penalty scored) Ginella; (penalty missed) Harvey; (penalty scored) Rossi; (penalty scored) Rodríguez; (penalty scored) Blessing

=== MLS Cup Playoffs ===
November 24 First round	Seattle Sounders FC	3–1	Los Angeles FC	Seattle, Washington
7:30 PM PST	Lodeiro 18', (yellow card) 88'; Ruidíaz 66'; Morris 80'	Report	Atuesta 77'; El-Munir (yellow card) 90+2'	Stadium: Lumen Field; Attendance: 0 Referee: Kevin Stott

=== CONCACAF Champions League ===
==== Round of 16 ====
February 18 First leg	León (Mexico)	2–0	(United States) Los Angeles FC	León, Mexico
7:00 PM	Meneses 21'; Aquino (yellow card) 45'; Mena 89'	Report	Blessing (yellow card) 43'; Palacios (yellow card) 61'	Stadium: Estadio León; Referee: Ismael Cornejo (El Salvador)

February 27 Second leg	Los Angeles FC (United States)	3–0 (3–2 agg.)	(Mexico) León	Los Angeles
7:00 PM	Kaye (yellow card) 13'; Atuesta (yellow card) 20'; Vela 27', 77'; Blackmon (yellow card) 61'; Rossi 79'	Report	Tesillo (yellow card) 29'; Montes (yellow card) 45'; J. Rodríguez (yellow card) 49'; Navarro (yellow card) 73'; Ramos (yellow card) 83'; Meneses (red card) 90+4'	Stadium: Banc of California Stadium; Attendance: 22,300; Referee: Mario Escobar (Guatemala)

==== Quarter-finals ====
December 16	Los Angeles FC (United States)	2–1	(Mexico) Cruz Azul	Orlando
7:30 PM PT	Vela 38' (pen.); Opoku 71'	Report	Yotún 15' (pen.), (yellow card) 83'; Aguilar (yellow card) 41'	Stadium: Exploria Stadium; Attendance: 0 Referee: Saíd Martínez (Honduras)
Note: Postponed and changed to a single-leg tie due to the COVID-19 pandemic. The series was originally scheduled as two-leg matches, with the home match of Los Angeles FC to take place at Banc of California Stadium, Los Angeles on March 12, 2020 (7:30 PM UTC−7), and the home match of Cruz Azul to take place at Estadio Azteca, Mexico City on March 18, 2020 (8:30 PM UTC−6).

==== Semi-finals ====
December 19	Los Angeles FC (United States)	3–1	(Mexico) América	Orlando
7:30 PM PT	Palacios (yellow card) 9'; Murillo (yellow card) 45+1'; Atuesta (red card) 45+5'; Vela 46', 47'; Blessing 90+5'	Report	Cáceres 12'; Cáseres (yellow card) 13'; Suárez (yellow card) 43'; Viñas (yellow card) 45+1'; Reyes (red card) 79'	Stadium: Exploria Stadium; Attendance: 0 Referee: Juan Gabriel Calderón (Costa Rica)
Note: Postponed and changed to a single-leg tie due to the COVID-19 pandemic.

==== Final ====
December 22	UANL (Mexico)	2–1	(United States) Los Angeles FC	Orlando
7:00 PM PT	Ayala 72'; Gignac 84'	Report	Rossi 61'	Stadium: Exploria Stadium; Attendance: 0 Referee: Mario Escobar (Guatemala)
Note: Postponed and changed to a single-leg tie due to the COVID-19 pandemic.

=== U.S. Open Cup ===
Due to their final standings position for the 2019 MLS season, Los Angeles FC was to enter the competition in the Fourth Round, to be played May 19–20. However, it was announced on August 14, 2020, that the tournament would be canceled due to the COVID-19 Pandemic.

== Player statistics ==
=== Appearances and goals ===
Last updated on November 1, 2020

No.	Pos	Nat	Player	Total		MLS		MLS is Back Playoffs		CONCACAF Champions League	
No.	Pos	Nat	Player	Apps	Goals	Apps	Goals	Apps	Goals	Apps	Goals
Goalkeepers
1	GK	(Netherlands) NED	Kenneth Vermeer	10	0	6	0	2	0	2	0
23	GK	(Mexico) MEX	Pablo Sisniega	14	0	14	0	0	0	0	0
40	GK	(United States) USA	Phillip Ejimadu	0	0	0	0	0	0	0	0
Defenders
2	DF	(United States) USA	Jordan Harvey	11	0	7+2	0	0+2	0	0	0
3	DF	(Senegal) SEN	Mohamed Traore	1	0	1	0	0	0	0	0
4	DF	(Colombia) COL	Eddie Segura	24	2	19+1	2	2	0	2	0
5	DF	(Canada) CAN	Dejan Jakovic	19	1	12+3	1	2	0	2	0
12	DF	(Ecuador) ECU	Diego Palacios	19	0	14+1	0	2	0	2	0
13	DF	(Libya) LBY	Mohamed El Monir	13	1	4+7	1	0+1	0	0+1	0
24	DF	(Honduras) HON	Andy Najar	7	0	1+6	0	0	0	0	0
27	DF	(United States) USA	Tristan Blackmon	16	0	9+3	0	2	0	2	0
28	DF	(Mexico) MEX	Tony Leone	0	0	0	0	0	0	0	0
43	DF	(United States) USA	Mark Segbers	0	0	0	0	0	0	0	0
94	DF	(Colombia) COL	Jesús David Murillo	3	0	3	0	0	0	0	0
Midfielders
7	MF	(Ghana) GHA	Latif Blessing	23	1	16+3	0	2	1	2	0
8	MF	(Uruguay) URU	Francisco Ginella	24	1	13+7	1	0+2	0	1+1	0
11	MF	(Ecuador) ECU	José Cifuentes	17	1	11+4	1	0+2	0	0	0
14	MF	(Canada) CAN	Mark-Anthony Kaye	19	3	15	3	2	0	2	0
18	MF	(United States) USA	Erik Dueñas	2	0	0+2	0	0	0	0	0
15	MF	(United States) USA	Alejandro Guido	0	0	0	0	0	0	0	0
19	MF	(United States) USA	Bryce Duke	10	0	2+7	0	0	0	0+1	0
20	MF	(Colombia) COL	Eduard Atuesta	18	1	12+3	1	2	0	1	0
Forwards
9	FW	(Uruguay) URU	Diego Rossi	21	16	17	13	2	2	2	1
10	FW	(Mexico) MEX	Carlos Vela	7	5	3+2	3	0	0	2	2
16	FW	(United States) USA	Danny Musovski	17	5	6+9	5	0+2	0	0	0
17	FW	(Uruguay) URU	Brian Rodríguez	21	3	17	2	2	1	2	0
21	FW	(United States) USA	Christian Torres	6	1	1+5	1	0	0	0	0
22	FW	(Ghana) GHA	Kwadwo Opoku	3	0	0+3	0	0	0	0	0
26	FW	(United States) USA	Adrien Perez	11	0	2+7	0	0	0	0+2	0
66	FW	(England) ENG	Bradley Wright-Phillips	20	9	14+4	8	2	1	0	0
Players who have made an appearance or had a squad number this season but have left the club
6	DF	(Brazil) BRA	Danilo Silva	1	0	1	0	0	0	0	0
99	FW	(Norway) NOR	Adama Diomande	1	0	0+1	0	0	0	0	0
