= 2018 Los Angeles FC season =

Los Angeles FC
2018 season
- General manager: John Thorrington
- Head coach: Bob Bradley
- Stadium: Banc of California Stadium
- MLS: Conference: 3rd Overall: 5th
- MLS Cup Playoffs: Knockout Round
- U.S. Open Cup: Semifinals
- Top goalscorer: League: Carlos Vela (14); All: Diego Rossi (17)
- Highest home attendance: 22,000
- Lowest home attendance: 22,000
- Average home league attendance: 22,000
Home colors	Away colors

The 2018 Los Angeles FC season was the club's inaugural season, and their first season in Major League Soccer, the top-tier of the American soccer pyramid. Los Angeles FC play its home games at the Banc of California Stadium in Exposition Park neighborhood of Los Angeles. Outside of MLS play, LAFC participated in the 2018 U.S. Open Cup tournament, and qualified for the 2018 MLS Cup Playoffs, being eliminated in the knockout round.

It was the first year since 2014 that there were two first-division soccer clubs that played in the Greater Los Angeles Area, following the disbandment of Chivas USA in 2014.

== Background ==
The team was first announced in October 2014, following the folding of Chivas USA. It was first reported in May 2015, that LAFC had chosen a location for their stadium, which would be the Los Angeles Memorial Sports Arena site at Exposition Park. The environmental impact report, arena demolition and stadium construction were expected to take three years and delayed the team's debut to 2018.

On July 27, 2017, Bob Bradley was announced as the coach for the inaugural season of the club. Bradley previously coached Swansea City in the English Premier League, as well as various European and Americans clubs as well. Internationally, Bradley previously coached the United States' and Egypt's national teams.

== Squad ==
=== First-team roster ===
As of July 26, 2018.

No.	Name	Nat	Date of birth (age)	Games	Goals
Goalkeepers
1	Tyler Miller	(United States)	March 12, 1993 (age 33)	18	0
13	Charlie Lyon	(United States)	April 10, 1992 (age 34)	0	0
18	Quillan Roberts	(Canada)	September 13, 1994 (age 31)	0	0
22	Luis López	(Honduras)	September 13, 1993 (age 32)	1	0
Defenders
2	Jordan Harvey	(United States)	January 28, 1984 (age 42)	14	0
3	Steven Beitashour	(Iran)	February 1, 1987 (age 39)	16	2
5	Dejan Jakovic	(Canada)	July 16, 1985 (age 40)	8	0
6	Danilo Silva	(Brazil)	November 24, 1986 (age 39)	0	0
25	Walker Zimmerman	(United States)	May 19, 1993 (age 33)	14	0
27	Tristan Blackmon	(United States)	August 12, 1996 (age 29)	7	0
44	João Moutinho	(Portugal)	January 12, 1998 (age 28)	10	1
Midfielders
8	André Horta	(Portugal)	November 7, 1996 (age 29)	0	0
11	Aaron Kovar	(United States)	August 14, 1993 (age 32)	5	0
14	Mark-Anthony Kaye	(Canada)	December 2, 1994 (age 31)	17	2
16	Calum Mallace	(Scotland)	January 10, 1990 (age 36)	4	0
19	James Murphy	(United States)	September 17, 1997 (age 28)	0	0
20	Eduard Atuesta	(Colombia)	June 18, 1997 (age 28)	14	1
24	Lee Nguyen	(United States)	October 7, 1986 (age 39)	10	0
33	Benny Feilhaber	(United States)	January 19, 1985 (age 41)	18	2
Forwards
7	Latif Blessing	(Ghana)	December 30, 1996 (age 29)	18	5
9	Diego Rossi	(Uruguay)	March 5, 1998 (age 28)	16	6
10	Carlos Vela	(Mexico)	March 1, 1989 (age 37)	13	7
12	Christian Ramirez	(United States)	April 4, 1991 (age 35)	1	0
18	Joshua Pérez	(United States)	January 21, 1998 (age 28)	0	0
21	Marco Ureña	(Costa Rica)	March 5, 1990 (age 36)	8	0
28	Shaft Brewer Jr.	(United States)	October 28, 1999 (age 26)	3	0
99	Adama Diomande	(Norway)	February 14, 1990 (age 36)	7	9

=== Team management ===
Position	Staff
Lead Managing Owner	Larry Berg
Co-Managing Owner	Brandon Beck
Co-Managing Owner	Bennett Rosenthal
Executive Chairman	Peter Guber
President	Tom Penn
Vice Chairman	Henry Nguyen
Director	Ruben Gnanalingam
Director	Vincent Tan
EVP and General Manager	John Thorrington
VP and Asst. General Manager	Will Kuntz

Source: LAFC

=== Technical Staff ===
Position	Staff
Head Coach	Bob Bradley
Director of Soccer Operations	Mike Sorber
Assistant Coach	Ante Razov
Assistant Coach	Marc Dos Santos
Assistant Coach	Kenny Arena
Goalkeeping Coach	Zak Abdel

Source: LAFC

== Transfers ==
=== Transfers in ===
Entry date	Position	No.	Player	From club	Notes	Ref.
March 23, 2017	MF	—	(United States) Carlos Alvarez	(United States) San Antonio FC	Transfer; loaned to Orange County SC for the 2017 USL season	
May 5, 2017	FW	—	(Nigeria) Monday Etim	(United States) Montverde Academy	Transfer; loaned to Orange County SC for the 2017 USL season	
August 10, 2017	FW	—	(Mexico) Carlos Vela	(Spain) Real Sociedad	Free transfer on January 1, 2018	
September 6, 2017	FW	—	(Argentina) Rodrigo Pacheco	(Argentina) Lanús	Loan; loaned to Orange County SC for the 2017 USL season	
November 18, 2017	DF	—	(Egypt) Omar Gaber	(Switzerland) Basel	Loan on January 1, 2018	
December 10, 2017	DF	—	(United States) Walker Zimmerman	(United States) FC Dallas	Traded for $250,000 GAM, $250,000 TAM, and No. 1 of the MLS Allocation Ranking	
December 12, 2017	GK	—	(United States) Tyler Miller	(United States) Seattle Sounders FC	Expansion draft	
December 12, 2017	FW	—	(Ghana) Latif Blessing	(United States) Sporting Kansas City	Expansion draft	
December 12, 2017	FW	—	(Costa Rica) Marco Ureña	(United States) San Jose Earthquakes	Expansion draft	
December 12, 2017	DF	—	(Finland) Jukka Raitala	(United States) San Jose Earthquakes	Expansion draft	
December 12, 2017	MF	—	(Canada) Raheem Edwards	(Canada) Toronto FC	Expansion draft	
December 12, 2017	DF	—	(Belgium) Laurent Ciman	(Canada) Montreal Impact	Traded for Raheem Edwards and Jukka Raitala	
December 14, 2017	FW	—	(Uruguay) Diego Rossi	(Uruguay) Peñarol	Transfer on January 1, 2018	
December 21, 2017	MF	—	(Scotland) Calum Mallace	(United States) Seattle Sounders FC	Selected in Stage 2 of the MLS Re-Entry Draft.	
December 23, 2017	DF	—	(United States) Jordan Harvey	(Canada) Vancouver Whitecaps FC	Free transfer on January 1, 2018	
January 3, 2018	MF	—	(United States) Benny Feilhaber	(United States) Sporting Kansas City	Traded for $200,000 GAM & $200,000 TAM	
January 23, 2018	MF	—	(United States) Aaron Kovar	(United States) Seattle Sounders FC	Loan on January 23, 2018	
January 24, 2018	DF	—	(Iran) Steven Beitashour	(Canada) Toronto FC	Free transfer on January 24, 2018	
January 24, 2018	GK	—	(Honduras) Luis Lopez	(Honduras) Real Espana	Free transfer on January 24, 2018	

=== Transfers out ===
Exit date	Position	No.	Player	To club	Notes	Ref.
December 12, 2017	DF	—	(Finland) Jukka Raitala	(Canada) Montreal Impact	Traded for Laurent Ciman	
December 12, 2017	MF	—	(Canada) Raheem Edwards	(Canada) Montreal Impact	Traded for Laurent Ciman	
December 14, 2017	MF	—	(United States) Carlos Alvarez	(United States) Las Vegas Lights FC	Option declined	
January 5, 2018	FW	—	(Haiti) Steeve Saint-Duc	(Norway) Strømmen IF	Loan	
April 26, 2018	MF	32	(Argentina) Nicolás Czornomaz	(United States) Orange County SC	Loan	
May 8, 2018	FW	50	(Argentina) Rodrigo Pacheco		Waived	
June 22, 2018	MF	19	(United States) James Murphy	(United States) Las Vegas Lights FC	Loan	
July 12, 2018	DF	4	(Egypt) Omar Gaber	(Egypt) Pyramids FC	Transfer	
July 13, 2018	GK	22	(Honduras) Luis López	(United States) Orange County SC	Loan	
August 15, 2018	DF	27	(United States) Tristan Blackmon	(United States) Phoenix Rising FC	Loan	
August 17, 2018	FW	28	(United States) Shaft Brewer Jr.	(United States) Phoenix Rising FC	Loan	
August 28, 2018	DF	23	(Belgium) Laurent Ciman	(France) Dijon FCO	Transfer	

=== Draft picks ===
Round	#	Position	Player	College/Club Team	Reference
1	1	DF	(Portugal) João Moutinho	Akron	
1	3	DF	(United States) Tristan Blackmon	Pacific	
2	24	MF	(Spain) Pol Calvet	Pittsburgh	
3	47	FW	(United States) Jordan Jones	Oregon State	

== Competitions ==
=== Preseason ===
February 2	Los Angeles FC	2–2	Toronto FC	Los Angeles, California
3:00 pm	Ureña	Report	Endoh; Giovinco	Stadium: Drake Stadium

February 9	Los Angeles FC	1–1	New York City FC	Los Angeles, California
3:00 pm	Ureña 16'	Report (LAFC); Report (NYCFC)	Herrera (yellow card) (red card); Ring 56'	Stadium: Drake Stadium

February 18	Los Angeles FC	4–4	Vancouver Whitecaps FC	Los Angeles, California
1:00 pm	Vela 3', 78' (pen.); Blessing 46'; Nerwinski 84' (o.g.)	Report	Blondell 10', 29' (yellow card) 40'; Norman Jr. (yellow card) 36'; Reyna 38', 52'	Stadium: Drake Stadium

February 25	Sacramento Republic	0–1	Los Angeles FC	Sacramento, California
2:00 pm	Partain (yellow card) 47'	Report	Moutinho 60'; Czornomaz (yellow card) 70'	Stadium: Papa Murphy's Park

=== Major League Soccer ===
==== Standings ====
===== Western Conference =====
Pos	Team	Pld	W	L	T	GF	GA	GD	Pts	Qualification
1	Sporting Kansas City	34	18	8	8	65	40	+25	62	MLS Cup Conference Semifinals
2	Seattle Sounders FC	34	18	11	5	52	37	+15	59	MLS Cup Conference Semifinals
3	Los Angeles FC	34	16	9	9	68	52	+16	57	MLS Cup Knockout Round
4	FC Dallas	34	16	9	9	52	44	+8	57	MLS Cup Knockout Round
5	Portland Timbers	34	15	10	9	54	48	+6	54	MLS Cup Knockout Round

Source: MLS

===== Overall =====
Pos	Team	Pld	W	L	T	GF	GA	GD	Pts	Qualification
3	Sporting Kansas City	34	18	8	8	65	40	+25	62	CONCACAF Champions League
4	Seattle Sounders FC	34	18	11	5	52	37	+15	59	
5	Los Angeles FC	34	16	9	9	68	52	+16	57	
6	FC Dallas	34	16	9	9	52	44	+8	57	
7	New York City FC	34	16	10	8	59	45	+14	56	

Source: MLS
Rules for classification: 1) points; 2) total wins; 3) total goal differential; 4) total goals scored; 5) disciplinary points; 6) away goals scored; 7) away goal differential; 8) coin toss or drawing of lots

==== Results ====
All times are Pacific.

March 4, 2018 1	Seattle Sounders FC	0–1	Los Angeles FC	Seattle
2:00 pm	Alfaro (yellow card) 79' (yellow-red card) 83'; Tolo (yellow card) 90+4'	Report	Rossi 11'; Feilhaber (yellow card) 69'	Stadium: CenturyLink Field; Attendance: 40,070; Referee: Jose Carlos Rivero

March 10, 2018 2	Real Salt Lake	1–5	Los Angeles FC	Sandy
12:30 pm	Plata 20'; Beckerman (yellow card) 29'	Report	Rossi 30', 81'; Blessing 33'; Feilhaber 47'; Vela 86'	Stadium: Rio Tinto Stadium; Attendance: 20,706; Referee: Baldomero Toledo

March 31, 2018 3	LA Galaxy	4–3	Los Angeles FC	Carson
12:00 pm	Lletget 61'; Pontius 73'; Ibrahimović 77', 90+1', (yellow card) 78'	Report	Vela 5', 26'; Steres 48' (o.g.)	Stadium: StubHub Center; Attendance: 27,068; Referee: Mark Geiger

April 7, 2018 4	Atlanta United FC	5–0	Los Angeles FC	Atlanta
5:00 pm EST	McCann (yellow card) 1'; Gressel 17'; Almirón (yellow card) 48' (goal) 88' (pen.), 90+2' (pen.); Martínez 67'; Williams 90+7', (yellow card) 90+8'	Report	Moutinho (yellow card) 90' (yellow-red card) 90+2'	Stadium: Mercedes-Benz Stadium; Attendance: 45,207; Referee: Ted Unkel

April 13, 2018 5	Vancouver Whitecaps FC	0–2	Los Angeles FC	Vancouver
7:30 pm	Nerwinski (yellow card) 62'; Techera (yellow card) 89'	Report	Vela 59', (yellow card) 90+1'; Rossi 70'; Kaye (yellow card) 78'	Stadium: BC Place; Attendance: 22,120; Referee: Robert Sibiga

April 21, 2018 6	Montreal Impact	3–5	Los Angeles FC	Montreal
10:00 am PDT	Piatti 9', 16', 43', (yellow card) 25'; Cabrera (red card) 31'; Silva (yellow card) 84'	Report	Ciman 24'; Feilhaber 52'; Raitala 57' (o.g.); Vela 83'; Blessing 89'	Stadium: Stade Saputo; Attendance: 20,302; Referee: Allen Chapman

April 29, 2018 7	Los Angeles FC	1–0	Seattle Sounders FC	Los Angeles
6:00 pm PST	Kaye (yellow card) 63'; Ciman 90+3'	Report	Alonso (yellow card) 15'; Roldan (yellow card) 82'	Stadium: Banc of California Stadium; Attendance: 22,000; Referee: Kevin Stott

May 5, 2018 8	Los Angeles FC	1–1	FC Dallas	Los Angeles
1:00 pm PST	Beitashour 9'	Report	Ulloa (yellow card) 39'; Urruti 55'; Hedges (yellow card) 89'	Stadium: Banc of California Stadium; Attendance: 22,000; Referee: Jair Murrufo

May 9, 2018 9	Los Angeles FC	2–0	Minnesota United FC	Los Angeles
7:00 pm PST	Atuesta 31', (yellow card) 40'; Kaye 37'	Report	Calvo (yellow card) 15'; Martin (yellow card) 33'; Gomez (yellow card) 34'; Maximiniano (yellow card) 62'; Heath (yellow card) 90'	Stadium: Banc of California Stadium; Attendance: 22,000; Referee: Silviu Petrescu

May 13, 2018 10	Los Angeles FC	2–2	New York City FC	Los Angeles
5:30 pm PST	Ibeagha 23' (o.g.); Atuesta (yellow card) 28'; Miller (yellow card) 32'; Gaber (yellow card) 37'; Vela 66'	Report	Villa 13' (pen.); Herrera (yellow card) 16'; Sweat (yellow card) 62'; Tajouri 75'	Stadium: Banc of California Stadium; Attendance: 22,000; Referee: Chris Penso

May 19, 2018 11	Portland Timbers	2–1	Los Angeles FC	Portland
12:00 noon	Chara (yellow card) 45'; Paredes 52'; Valentin (yellow card) 54'; Armenteros 81', (yellow card) 82'	Report	Beitashour (yellow card) 21'; Kaye (yellow card) 53'; Zimmerman (yellow card) 66'; Vela 74'	Stadium: Providence Park; Attendance: 21,144; Referee: Drew Fischer

May 26, 2018 12	Los Angeles FC	1–1	D.C. United	Los Angeles
22:00 EDT	Rossi 39'; Jakovic (red card) 45+2'	Report	Durkin (yellow card) 53'; Fisher (yellow card) 59'; Arriola (yellow card) 80'; Mattocks 84'; Miranda (yellow card) 85'	Stadium: Banc of California Stadium; Attendance: 22,000; Referee: Ismail Elfath

June 2, 2018 13	FC Dallas	2–1	Los Angeles FC	Frisco
5:00 pm	Ziegler 25'; Lamah 51'; Gruezo (yellow card) 70'	Report	Nguyen (yellow card) 49'; Diomande 61'; Harvey (yellow card) 72' (yellow-red card) 89'	Stadium: Toyota Stadium; Attendance: 14,022; Referee: Chapman

June 9, 2018 14	San Jose Earthquakes	3–4	Los Angeles FC	San Jose
7:30 pm	Qazaishvili 11'; Partida (yellow card) 22' (yellow-red card) 90+6'; Wondolowski 52', 63'	Report	Diomande 15', 90'; Beitashour 19'; Zimmerman (yellow card) 26'; Moutinho 90+7', (yellow card) 90+8'	Stadium: Avaya Stadium; Attendance: 17,650; Referee: Grajeda

June 23, 2018 15	Los Angeles FC	2–0	Columbus Crew SC	Los Angeles
7:30 pm	Ciman 3'; Diomande 8'; Atuesta (yellow card) 24'	Report	Abubakar (yellow card) 34'; Santos (yellow card) 61'; Higuaín (yellow card) 69'; Valenzuela (yellow card) 70'	Stadium: Banc of California Stadium; Attendance: 22,000; Referee: Kevin Stott

June 30, 2018 16	Los Angeles FC	4–1	Philadelphia Union	Los Angeles
5:00 pm	Diomande 25', 43', 55'; Beitashour (yellow card) 39'; Nguyen (yellow card) 85'; Blessing 90+6'	Report	Picault 45'	Stadium: Banc of California Stadium; Attendance: 22,000; Referee: Robert Sibiga

July 3, 2018 17	Houston Dynamo	2–2	Los Angeles FC	Houston
6:00 pm	Fuenmayor (yellow card) 30'; García (yellow card) 56'; Manotas 90+4'; Senderos 90+6'	Report	Blessing 5'; Zimmerman (yellow card) 22'; Diomande (yellow card) 27'; Kaye 72'; Blackmon (yellow card) 75'	Stadium: BBVA Compass Stadium; Attendance: 16,037; Referee: Armando Villarreal

July 7, 2018 18	Los Angeles FC	4–1	Orlando City SC	Los Angeles
1:30 pm	Diomande 28', 82'; Blessing 32'; Rossi 84'; Ciman (yellow card) 90+1'	Report	Kljestan 59'; Allen (yellow card) 61'; Rosell (yellow card) 81'	Stadium: Banc of California Stadium; Attendance: 22,000; Referee: Chris Penso

July 15, 2018 19	Los Angeles FC	0–0	Portland Timbers	Los Angeles
3:00 pm	Feilhaber (yellow card) 43'; Nguyen (red card) 84'; Zimmerman (yellow card) 90+3'	Report	Chara (yellow card) 45+3'; Blanco (yellow card) 84'	Stadium: Banc of California Stadium; Attendance: 22,000; Referee: Silviu Petrescu

July 22, 2018 20	Minnesota United FC	5–1	Los Angeles FC	Minneapolis
4:00 pm	Schüller 25'; Ramirez 45'; Quintero 45+1'; Ibarra 56'; Ramirez 58'	Report	Feilhaber 26'; Harvey (yellow card) 85'	Stadium: TCF Bank Stadium; Attendance: 22,739; Referee: Ted Unkel

July 26, 2018 21	Los Angeles FC	2–2	LA Galaxy	Los Angeles
7:30 pm	Vela 7'; Nguyen 20'	Report	Alessandrini (yellow card) 37', (goal) 82'; Giovani (yellow card) 51'; Skjelvik (yellow card) 71'; Kamara 86'; Lletget (yellow card) 89'	Stadium: Banc of California Stadium; Attendance: 22,716; Referee: Alan Kelly

August 5, 2018 22	New York Red Bulls	2–1	Los Angeles FC	Harrison
3:00 pm	Royer 39', 80'; Wright-Phillips (yellow card) 60'	Report	Rossi 53'; Miller (yellow card) 38'	Stadium: Red Bull Arena; Attendance: 20,402; Referee: Allen Chapman

August 11, 2018 23	Los Angeles FC	0–2	Sporting Kansas City	Los Angeles
7:30 pm	Nguyen (yellow card) 36'; Jakovic (yellow card) 63'	Report	Fernandes 17'; Ilie 66'; Espinoza (yellow card) 70'; Zusi (yellow card) 72'	Stadium: Banc of California Stadium; Attendance: 22,000; Referee: Ismail Elfath

August 15, 2018 24	Los Angeles FC	2–0	Real Salt Lake	Los Angeles
7:00 pm	Ramirez 13', 30'; Atuesta (yellow card) 33'	Report	Sunny (yellow card) 24'; Lennon (yellow card) 38'; Barry (yellow card) 43'; Beckerman (yellow card) 63'; Glad (yellow card) 84'	Stadium: Banc of California Stadium; Attendance: 22,000; Referee: Dave Gantar

August 19, 2018 25	Los Angeles FC	2–0	Colorado Rapids	Los Angeles
7:00 pm	Feilhaber (yellow card) 45+4'; Nguyen 49'; Silva (yellow card) 63'; Rossi 80'	Report	Smith (yellow card) 34'; Jackson (yellow card) 54'	Stadium: Banc of California Stadium; Attendance: 22,000; Referee: Nima Saghafi

August 24, 2018 26	LA Galaxy	1–1	Los Angeles FC	Carson
7:30 pm	Ibrahimović 15', (yellow card) 59'; Feltscher (yellow card) 18'; Pontius (yellow card) 45+2'; Skjelvik (yellow card) 67'; Romney (yellow card) 86'	Report	Feilhaber (yellow card) 48'; Vela 51' (pen.)	Stadium: StubHub Center; Attendance: 27,068; Referee: Jair Marrufo

September 1, 2018 27	Toronto FC	2–4	Los Angeles FC	Toronto
5:00 pm	Delgado (yellow card) 34'; Altidore (yellow card) 48', (goal) 74', 90+4'; Bradley (yellow card) 78'	Report	Jakovic (yellow card) 18'; Vela 23', 90+4'; Rossi 47'; Nguyen 49'	Stadium: BMO Field; Attendance: 28,247; Referee: Ted Unkel

September 15, 2018 28	Los Angeles FC	1–1	New England Revolution	Los Angeles
7:30 pm	Beitashour (yellow card) 41'; Ureña 52'	Report	Caldwell (yellow card) 37'; Bunbury (yellow card) 67'; Caicedo (yellow card) 77'; Bye 82'	Stadium: Banc of California Stadium; Attendance: 22,000; Referee: Mark Geiger

September 22, 2018 29	Los Angeles FC	2–0	San Jose Earthquakes	Los Angeles
12:30 pm	Zimmerman 41', 68'	Report	Jungwirth (yellow card) 43'; Godoy (yellow card) 52'	Stadium: Banc of California Stadium; Attendance: 22,000; Referee: Robert Sibiga

September 29, 2018 30	Chicago Fire	3–1	Los Angeles FC	Bridgeview
12:30 pm	Mihailovic 20'; McCarty (yellow card) 24'; Nikolić 29' (pen.), (yellow card) 56'; Katai 66'; Bronico (yellow card) 79'; Kappelhof (yellow card) 90+3'	Report	Rossi 73'	Stadium: Toyota Park; Attendance: 18,471; Referee: Chris Penso

October 6, 2018 31	Colorado Rapids	0–3	Los Angeles FC	Commerce City
6:00 pm	Castillo (yellow card) 39'; Gashi (yellow card) 53'; Acosta (yellow card) 77'; Jackson (yellow card) 81'	Report	Zimmerman 15'; Diomande 42', 48'	Stadium: Dick's Sporting Goods Park; Attendance: 15,369; Referee: Armando Villarreal

October 12, 2018 32	Los Angeles FC	4–2	Houston Dynamo	Los Angeles
7:00 pm	Silva (yellow card) 19'; Nguyen (yellow card) 35'; Vela 44' (pen.); Diomande 53'; Zimmerman 58'	Report	Manotas 33'; Deric (yellow card) 44'; Cerén (yellow card) 45+1'; Wenger 80'	Stadium: Banc of California Stadium; Attendance: 22,000; Referee: Alan Kelly

October 21, 2018 33	Los Angeles FC	2–2	Vancouver Whitecaps FC	Los Angeles
2:00 pm	Rossi 5', 15'; Feilhaber (yellow card) 32'	Report	Reyna 22' (pen.), (yellow card) 52'; Davies (yellow card) 62'; Mutch 65', (yellow card) 90+2'	Stadium: Banc of California Stadium; Attendance: 22,000; Referee: Nima Saghafi

October 28, 2018 34	Sporting Kansas City	2–1	Los Angeles FC	Kansas City
1:30 pm	Russell (yellow card) 14'; Espinoza 37'; Sinovic (red card) 62'; Gutiérrez (yellow card) 70'; Sallói 72'; Melia (yellow card) 90+1'	Report	Atuesta (yellow card) 8'; Vela 63' (pen.)	Stadium: Children's Mercy Park; Attendance: 20,702; Referee: Allen Chapman

=== MLS Cup Playoffs ===
November 1, 2018 Knockout round	Los Angeles FC	2–3	Real Salt Lake	Los Angeles
7:30 pm PDT	Vela (yellow card) 26'; Silva 31'; Zimmerman (yellow card) 47'; Ramirez 54'	Report	Kreilach 21', 58'; Herrera (yellow card) 30'; Savarino (yellow card) 45+2'; Baird (yellow card) 54'; Zimmerman 69' (o.g.); Rusnák (yellow card) 75'; Sunny (yellow card) 86'	Stadium: Banc of California Stadium; Attendance: 22,000; Referee: Mark Geiger

=== U.S. Open Cup ===
June 6, 2018 Fourth round	Los Angeles FC	2–0	Fresno FC	Los Angeles
19:00 (PDT)	Rossi 53'; Blessing 56'	Report	Caffa (yellow card) 63'; Cazarez (yellow card) 80'	Stadium: Banc of California Stadium; Attendance: 7,500; Referee: Mark Allatin

June 20, 2018 Round of 16	Los Angeles FC	3–2	Sacramento Republic	Los Angeles
19:30 (PDT)	Feilhaber 58'; Rossi 67'; Blessing 89'	Report	Rodriguez (yellow card) 18'; Hord 35'; Gomez (yellow card) 45+2'; Bijev 60'; Matjašič (yellow card) 66'	Stadium: Banc of California Stadium; Attendance: 8,750; Referee: Nima Saghafi

July 18, 2018 Quarter-finals	Los Angeles FC	3–2	Portland Timbers	Los Angeles
19:30 (PDT)	Guzman 33' (o.g.); Vela 38'; Ureña 51'	Report	Cascante 45+2'; Andriuskevicius 52'	Stadium: Banc of California Stadium; Attendance: 17,898; Referee: Ramy Touchan

August 8, 2018 Semi-finals	Houston Dynamo	3–3 (a.e.t.) (7–6 p)	Los Angeles FC	Houston, Texas
17:30 (PDT)	Wenger 12'; Manotas 25'; Martínez (yellow card) 45+2'; Elis (yellow card) 50'; Rodríguez 75'; Cerén (yellow card) 107'	Report	Rossi 6', 78', 90+5'; Atuesta (yellow card) 58'	Stadium: BBVA Compass Stadium; Attendance: 7,581; Referee: Rubiel Vazquez
	Penalties
	Cerén (penalty scored); Rodríguez (penalty scored); Elis (penalty scored); García (penalty missed); Martínez (penalty scored); Gil (penalty scored); Wenger (penalty scored); Senderos (penalty scored)		(penalty scored) Beitashour; (penalty scored) Kovar; (penalty scored) Horta; (penalty scored) Vela; (penalty missed) Ciman; (penalty scored) Harvey; (penalty scored) Rossi; (penalty missed) Blessing

=== Friendlies ===
May 22, 2018	Los Angeles FC	1–1	BVB Dortmund	Los Angeles
7:00 pm PDT				Stadium: Banc of California Stadium; Attendance: 22,000

== Player statistics ==
=== Appearances and goals ===
Last updated on November 1, 2018

No.	Pos	Nat	Player	Total		MLS		U.S. Open Cup		MLS Cup Playoffs	
No.	Pos	Nat	Player	Apps	Goals	Apps	Goals	Apps	Goals	Apps	Goals
Goalkeepers
1	GK	(United States) USA	Tyler Miller	38	0	33	0	4	0	1	0
13	GK	(United States) USA	Charlie Lyon	0	0	0	0	0	0	0	0
18	GK	(Canada) CAN	Quillan Roberts	0	0	0	0	0	0	0	0
Defenders
2	DF	(United States) USA	Jordan Harvey	34	0	24+6	0	3	0	1	0
3	DF	(Iran) IRN	Steven Beitashour	35	2	31	2	3	0	1	0
5	DF	(Canada) CAN	Dejan Jakovic	18	0	13+2	0	1+2	0	0	0
6	DF	(Brazil) BRA	Danilo Silva	12	2	10+1	1	0	0	1	1
25	DF	(United States) USA	Walker Zimmerman	32	4	27	4	4	0	1	0
44	DF	(Portugal) POR	João Moutinho	15	1	10+4	1	1	0	0	0
Midfielders
8	MF	(Portugal) POR	André Horta	12	0	3+8	0	0+1	0	0	0
11	MF	(United States) USA	Aaron Kovar	16	0	7+5	0	2+1	0	0+1	0
14	MF	(Canada) CAN	Mark-Anthony Kaye	22	2	20	2	1+1	0	0	0
16	MF	(Scotland) SCO	Calum Mallace	7	0	0+5	0	1+1	0	0	0
20	MF	(Colombia) COL	Eduard Atuesta	30	1	16+10	1	3	0	0+1	0
24	MF	(United States) USA	Lee Nguyen	31	3	21+5	3	4	0	1	0
33	MF	(United States) USA	Benny Feilhaber	39	4	33+2	3	2+1	1	1	0
Forwards
7	FW	(Ghana) GHA	Latif Blessing	36	7	19+12	5	4	2	1	0
9	FW	(Uruguay) URU	Diego Rossi	38	17	31+2	12	3+1	5	1	0
10	FW	(Mexico) MEX	Carlos Vela	32	15	27+2	14	2	1	1	0
12	FW	(United States) USA	Christian Ramirez	9	4	3+5	3	0	0	0+1	1
18	FW	(United States) USA	Joshua Pérez	2	0	0+2	0	0	0	0	0
21	FW	(Costa Rica) CRC	Marco Ureña	19	2	11+7	1	1	1	0	0
99	FW	(Norway) NOR	Adama Diomande	22	12	15+4	12	1+1	0	1	0
Players who have made an appearance or had a squad number this season but have left the club
22	GK	(Honduras) HON	Luis López	1	0	1	0	0	0	0	0
4	DF	(Egypt) EGY	Omar Gaber	7	0	2+5	0	0	0	0	0
23	DF	(Belgium) BEL	Laurent Ciman	24	3	22	3	2	0	0	0
27	DF	(United States) USA	Tristan Blackmon	11	0	5+4	0	2	0	0	0
19	MF	(United States) USA	James Murphy	0	0	0	0	0	0	0	0
28	FW	(United States) USA	Shaft Brewer Jr.	4	0	0+3	0	0+1	0	0	0
50	FW	(Argentina) ARG	Rodrigo Pacheco	1	0	0+1	0	0	0	0	0

=== Top scorers ===
Place	Position	Name	MLS	MLS Cup	U.S. Open Cup	Total
1	FW	(Uruguay) Diego Rossi	12	0	5	17
2	FW	(Mexico) Carlos Vela	14	0	1	15
3	FW	(Norway) Adama Diomande	12	0	0	12
4	FW	(Ghana) Latif Blessing	5	0	2	7
5	DF	(United States) Walker Zimmerman	4	0	0	4
5	MF	(United States) Benny Feilhaber	3	0	1	4
7	DF	(Belgium) Laurent Ciman	3	0	0	3
7	MF	(United States) Lee Nguyen	3	0	0	3
7	FW	(United States) Christian Ramirez	2	1	0	3
10	DF	(Iran) Steven Beitashour	2	0	0	2
10	MF	(Canada) Mark-Anthony Kaye	2	0	0	2
10	FW	(Costa Rica) Marco Ureña	1	0	1	2
13	MF	(Colombia) Eduard Atuesta	1	0	0	1
13	DF	(Portugal) João Moutinho	1	0	0	1
13	DF	(Brazil) Danilo Silva	0	1	0	1
Own goals			3	0	1	4
Total			68	2	11	81

As of November 2, 2018.

== See also ==
- 2018 Orange County SC season
