= Francisco Ginella =

Uruguayan footballer (born 1999)

Personal information
- Full name: Francisco Ginella Dabezies
- Date of birth: 21 January 1999 (age 27)
- Place of birth: Montevideo, Uruguay
- Height: 1.82 m (6 ft 0 in)
- Position: Midfielder

Team information
- Current team: Defensor Sporting
- Number: 45

Youth career
- Montevideo Wanderers

Senior career*
Years	Team	Apps	(Gls)
2018–2019	Montevideo Wanderers	32	(1)
2019–2024	Los Angeles FC	54	(1)
2022–2024	→ Nacional (loan)	9	(0)
2024–2025	Al Rayyan	0	(0)
2025–	Defensor Sporting	16	(0)

International career
2014	Uruguay U15	3	(2)
2017	Uruguay U18	2	(0)
2018–2019	Uruguay U20	14	(1)
2019	Uruguay U22	5	(0)
2020	Uruguay U23	8	(1)
2024	Uruguay local	1	(0)
- * Club domestic league appearances and goals as of 1 October 2025

Francisco Ginella Dabezies (Italian: [dʒiˈnɛlla]; born 21 January 1999), commonly known as "Pancho" Ginella, is a Uruguayan professional footballer who plays for Defensor Sporting.

== Club career ==
=== Montevideo Wanderers ===
A product of the club's youth academy, Ginella saw his first inclusion in the matchday squad in the form of three appearances among the substitutes at the end of the 2017 season. He wouldn't see inclusion in a match squad until 15 April 2018, the 12th matchday of the 2018 season, coming on as an 83rd minute substitute for Manuel Castro in a 3–2 victory over Racing Club, making his competitive debut in the process. After a week on the bench while the club fell 3–0 to River Plate, Ginella was awarded his first start against Cerro on April 28, playing the entirety of a 1–0 defeat. He made another start the following matchday against Liverpool in the final game of the Apertura, before going on to make three appearances during the Intermedio group stage against Racing Club, Liverpool, and Fénix as the club bowed out in the group stages. During the Clausura, Ginella would make just one appearance, a sixteen minute stint replacing Diego Riolfo in a 2–2 draw with Danubio.

Minutes were much more plentiful for Ginella in 2019, as he registered nearly four times as many as the year prior. He made eight appearances during the Apertura, seven of which were starts, up from three in 2018. During this time, in April, he would get his first taste of continental football in the form of a start in a Copa Sudamericana group stage match against Sport Huancayo which ended 1–1. Ginella would score his first competitive goal for the club in the first match of the Intermedio, a late consolation in a 2–1 defeat to Plaza Colonia. He registered a total of five appearances in the Intermedio, before playing a part in 12 matches during the Clausura campaign. In November 2018, Ginella and fellow Uruguayan Matías Viña were subject to interest from Inter Milan, with Ginella also being courted by Fiorentina. However, no offer was made by the club.

=== Los Angeles FC ===
In December 2019, Ginella was purchased by MLS club Los Angeles FC for $2.5 million, signing a four-year contract. He made his debut for the club in LAFC's CONCACAF Champions League Round of 16 tie, playing the entirety of the away leg at Club León, which his side lost 2–0. Ginella also played a part, albeit much more subdued, in the second leg, registering seven minutes off the bench in place of Eduard Atuesta. Ginella made appearances in the club's first two MLS matches of the season as well, starting against Inter Miami and being subbed on against the Philadelphia Union. On October 11 2020, Ginella scored his first goal in a 3–1 win against the Seattle Sounders.

On August 12, 2024, Ginella and Los Angeles FC agreed to terminate his contract.

=== Nacional (loan) ===
On July 18, 2022, Ginella was loaned out to Uruguayan club Nacional for a 12-month long loan.

=== Al Rayyan SC ===
After leaving Los Angeles FC, Ginella joins Qatar Stars League club Al Rayyan SC on September 24, 2024.

== International career ==
As a youth international, Ginella has represented Uruguay at the 2019 FIFA U-20 World Cup, 2019 Pan American Games and the 2020 CONMEBOL Pre-Olympic Tournament.

In May 2024, Ginella was named in the first ever Uruguay local national team squad. He made his Uruguay local team debut on 31 May 2024 in a goalless draw against Costa Rica.

== Personal life ==
Ginella holds both Uruguayan and Italian citizenship.

== Career statistics ==
As of 9 November 2021

Appearances and goals by club, season and competition
Club	Season	League			Cup		Continental		Other		Total	
Club	Season	Division	Apps	Goals	Apps	Goals	Apps	Goals	Apps	Goals	Apps	Goals
Montevideo Wanderers	2018	Primera División	7	0	—		0	0	—		7	0
Montevideo Wanderers	2019	Primera División	25	1	—		1 (Note: Appearance in Copa Sudamericana.)	0	—		26	1
Montevideo Wanderers	Total		32	1	0	0	1	0	0	0	33	1
Los Angeles FC	2020	MLS	22 (Note: Includes three appearances in MLS is Back Tournament group stage.)	1	—		4 (Note: Appearances in CONCACAF Champions League.)	0	3 (Note: Two appearances in MLS is Back Tournament knockout stage and one appearance in MLS Cup Playoffs.)	0	29	1
Los Angeles FC	2021	MLS	17	0	—		—		—		17	0
Los Angeles FC	Total		39	1	—		4	0	3	0	46	1
Career total			71	2	0	0	5	0	3	0	79	2

== Honours ==
Nacional

- Uruguayan Primera División: 2022
