= Tristan Blackmon =

American soccer player (born 1996)

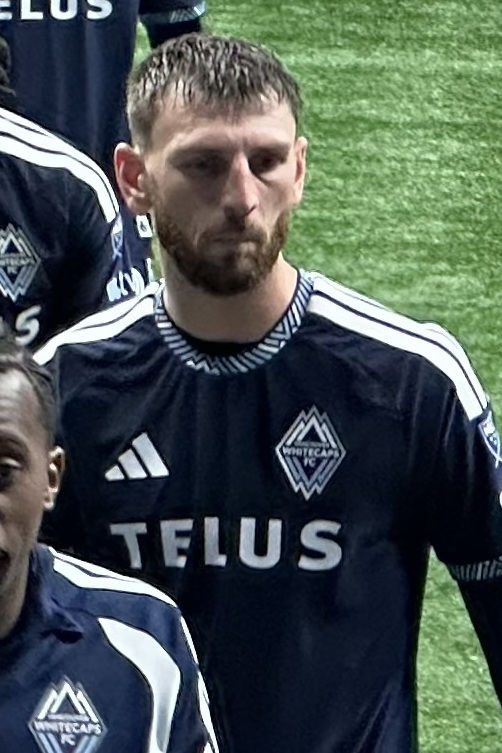
- Blackmon in 2026

Personal information
- Full name: Tristan Michael Blackmon
- Date of birth: August 12, 1996 (age 30)
- Place of birth: Las Vegas, Nevada, U.S.
- Height: 6 ft 2 in (1.88 m)
- Position: Defender

Team information
- Current team: Vancouver Whitecaps FC
- Number: 33

College career
Years	Team	Apps	(Gls)
2014–2017	Pacific Tigers	70	(16)

Senior career*
Years	Team	Apps	(Gls)
2016	Orange County SC U23	7	(0)
2017	Burlingame Dragons FC	3	(0)
2018–2021	Los Angeles FC	64	(2)
2018–2019	→ Phoenix Rising FC (loan)	10	(0)
2022–	Vancouver Whitecaps FC	108	(5)

International career^{‡}
2025–	United States	2	(0)
- * Club domestic league appearances and goals as of September 13, 2025 ‡ National team caps and goals as of September 9, 2025

Tristan Michael Blackmon (born August 12, 1996) is an American professional soccer player who plays as a defender for Major League Soccer club Vancouver Whitecaps FC and the United States national team.

== Early life ==
He attended Bishop Gorman High School in Summerlin, Nevada, a suburb of Las Vegas.

== College career ==
Blackmon played his college career at University of the Pacific where he played mainly as a defender after starting as a forward. Blackmon played 70 matches for the Tigers, starting 68. He scored 16 goals and had nine assists. Blackmon finished his collegiate soccer career as the Tigers' all-time goal scoring leader, until Camden Riley broke his record one year later.

== Club career ==
Blackmon played for Premier Development League sides Orange County SC U-23 and Burlingame Dragons in 2016 and 2017, respectively.

On January 19, 2018, Los Angeles FC selected Blackmon with the third overall pick of the 2018 MLS SuperDraft. He signed with the club on February 22, 2018. Blackmon made his professional debut on March 4, 2018, as an 80th-minute substitute during a 1–0 win over Seattle Sounders FC. On May 24, 2019, at Banc of California Stadium, in a 4–2 win over the Montreal Impact, Blackmon scored his first professional goal on a header in the fifty-fifth minute.

On December 14, 2021, Blackmon was selected by Charlotte FC in the 2021 MLS Expansion Draft, before being immediately traded to Vancouver Whitecaps FC in exchange for $475,000 of General Allocation Money. On July 26, 2022, Blackmon scored the winning penalty kick for Vancouver against Toronto FC in the Canadian Championship Final. On April 9, 2025, Blackmon scored a dramatic late equalizer against UNAM sending the Vancouver Whitecaps to the semi final of the 2025 CONCACAF Champions Cup. On October 28, Blackmon was named 2025 MLS Defender of the Year. Blackmon contributed two goals and one assist and was an integral part of the second-best defense in the league, which helped the Vancouver Whitecaps to their best season, during which they recorded their best points total, most total league wins, their best goal differential, and total goals scored.

== International career ==
In January 2021, Blackmon was called up to the United States national team for the first time for a training camp.

In May 2025, it was reported that Blackmon was contacted by Canada national team coach Jesse Marsch about potentially representing Canada at international level. Blackmon did not have Canadian citizenship, but would potentially be eligible through meeting residency requirements through his time playing with Vancouver Whitecaps FC.

Later in May 2025, he was named to the preliminary roster for the United States national team for the 2025 Gold Cup (although he was not ultimately named to the final roster). In September 2025, he was called up to a United States matchday squad for the first time, ahead of a pair of friendlies. On September 6, 2025, he made his international debut in a friendly against South Korea.

== Career statistics ==
=== Club ===
As of match played December 6, 2025

Appearances and goals by club, season and competition
Club	Season	League			Playoffs		National cup (Note: Includes U.S. Open Cup, Canadian Championship)		Continental		Other		Total	
Club	Season	Division	Apps	Goals	Apps	Goals	Apps	Goals	Apps	Goals	Apps	Goals	Apps	Goals
Orange County SC U23	2016	Premier Development League	7	0	—		—		—		—		7	0
Burlingame Dragons FC	2017	Premier Development League	3	0	—		2	0	—		—		5	0
Los Angeles FC	2018	Major League Soccer	10	0	2	0	—		—		—		12	0
Los Angeles FC	2019	Major League Soccer	18	1	2	0	3	0	—		—		23	1
Los Angeles FC	2020	Major League Soccer	14 (Note: Includes three appearances in MLS is Back Tournament group stage)	0	1	0	—		5 (Note: Appearances in CONCACAF Champions League/Cup)	0	2 (Note: Appearances in MLS is Back Tournament knockout stage)	0	22	0
Los Angeles FC	2021	Major League Soccer	22	1	—		—		—		—		22	1
Los Angeles FC	Total		64	2	5	0	3	0	5	0	2	0	79	2
Phoenix Rising (loan)	2018	USL Championship	5	0	3	0	—		—		—		8	0
Phoenix Rising (loan)	2019	USL Championship	5	0	—		—		—		—		5	0
Phoenix Rising (loan)	Total		10	0	3	0	—		—		—		13	0
Vancouver Whitecaps FC	2022	Major League Soccer	28	1	—		1	0	—		—		29	1
Vancouver Whitecaps FC	2023	Major League Soccer	30	2	2	0	3	0	4	1	3 (Note: Appearances in Leagues Cup)	0	42	3
Vancouver Whitecaps FC	2024	Major League Soccer	25	0	4	0	1	0	2	0	0	0	32	0
Vancouver Whitecaps FC	2025	Major League Soccer	25	2	2	0	3	2	8	1	—		38	5
Vancouver Whitecaps FC	Total		108	5	8	0	8	2	14	2	3	0	141	9
Career total			192	7	16	0	13	2	19	2	5	0	245	11

=== International ===
As of match played September 9, 2025

Appearances and goals by national team and year
National team	Year	Apps	Goals
United States	2025	2	0
Total		2	0

== Honors ==
Los Angeles FC

- Supporters' Shield: 2019

Vancouver Whitecaps

- Canadian Championship: 2022, 2023, 2024, 2025

Individual

- MLS All-Star: 2025
- MLS Best XI: 2025
- MLS Defender of the Year: 2025
