= Zak Abdel =

Egyptian footballer and coach (born 1961)

Zak Abel
Personal information
- Date of birth: 20 July 1961 (age 65)
- Position: Goalkeeper

Zak Abdel (Arabic: زكي عبد الفتاح, romanized: Zaki Abdul Fattah; born 20 July 1961, Cairo, Egypt) is a former professional soccer player who played as a goalkeeper. He currently works as a professional goalkeeping coach.

== Career ==
Abdel had a 16-year professional playing career for Ghazl El Mahalla SC of the Egyptian First Division, winning two championships.

He has worked in international football as goalkeeper coach for the USMNT (2007–2011) and the Egypt national football team (2011–2014) and the Canada men's national soccer team.

He worked as the goalkeeper coach at MLS soccer club LA Galaxy for 7 years, as well as with the now defunct Chivas USA.

He was announced in the goalkeeping coach role at the newly formed Los Angeles FC ahead of their inaugural season in 2018, working under former National team coach Bob Bradley, with whom he has consistently worked for a number of years.

On 20 July 2019, Abdel had an altercation with Zlatan Ibrahimović, following elbowing Mohamed El Monir.
