= Pablo Sisniega =

Mexican footballer (born 1995)

- Sisniega in 2026

Personal information
- Full name: Pablo Eduardo Sisniega Fink
- Date of birth: 7 July 1995 (age 31)
- Place of birth: Mexico City, Mexico
- Height: 6 ft 3 in (1.91 m)
- Position: Goalkeeper

Team information
- Current team: San Diego FC
- Number: 13

Youth career
- 2004–2009: Guadalajara
- 2009–2012: Philadelphia Union
- 2012–2014: Real Sociedad

Senior career*
Years	Team	Apps	(Gls)
2014–2019	Real Sociedad B	38	(0)
2019–2021	Los Angeles FC	28	(0)
2022–2023	Charlotte FC	5	(0)
2023	Crown Legacy FC	1	(0)
2024	San Antonio FC	22	(0)
2025–	San Diego FC	4	(0)
- * Club domestic league appearances and goals as of 22 October 2025

Pablo Eduardo Sisniega Fink (born 7 July 1995) is a Mexican professional footballer who plays as goalkeeper for Major League Soccer club San Diego FC.

== Career ==
After spending time with Real Sociedad, Sisniega joined Major League Soccer side Los Angeles FC on 18 February 2019.

Sisniega made his professional debut on 11 June 2019, starting in a 3–0 win over Real Salt Lake in a Lamar Hunt US Open Cup fixture. On 20 June 2019, with Tyler Miller away at the 2019 Gold Cup, Sisniega made eight saves to help Los Angeles win 3–1 over San Jose Earthquakes in the Round of 16 of the US Open Cup. On 3 July 2019, in his second MLS appearance, Sisniega made several key saves to help his team in a 5–1 away win at Sporting Kansas City, including an 82nd minute penalty save on Daniel Salloi.

On 12 December 2021, Sisniega was traded to Charlotte FC in exchange for $50,000 of General Allocation Money ahead of their inaugural MLS season in 2022.

On 12 January 2024, Sisniega signed with USL Championship side San Antonio FC.

On 27 December 2024, Sisniega joined MLS side San Diego FC ahead of their inaugural season.

== Career statistics ==
=== Club ===
As of match played 31 October 2024

Appearances and goals by club, season and competition
Club	Season	League			Cup		Continental		Other		Total	
Club	Season	Division	Apps	Goals	Apps	Goals	Apps	Goals	Apps	Goals	Apps	Goals
Real Sociedad B	2014–15	Segunda División B	2	0	—		—		—		2	0
Real Sociedad B	2015–16	Segunda División B	14	0	—		—		—		14	0
Real Sociedad B	2016–17	Segunda División B	21	0	—		—		—		21	0
Real Sociedad B	2018–19	Segunda División B	1	0	—		—		—		1	0
Real Sociedad B	Total		38	0	—		—		—		38	0
Los Angeles FC	2019	MLS	6	0	3	0	—		—		9	0
Los Angeles FC	2020	MLS	14	0	—		—		1 (Note: Appearance in MLS Cup Playoffs)	0	15	0
Los Angeles FC	2021	MLS	8	0	—		—		—		8	0
Los Angeles FC	Total		28	0	3	0	—		1	0	32	0
Charlotte FC	2022	MLS	2	0	—		—		—		2	0
Charlotte FC	2023	MLS	3	0	—		—		—		3	0
Charlotte FC	Total		5	0	—		—		—		5	0
Crown Legacy FC	2023	MLS Next Pro	1	0	—		—		—		1	0
San Antonio FC	2024	USL	22	0	—		—		—		22	0
Career Total			94	0	1	0	3	0	0	0	98	0

== Honours ==
Los Angeles FC

- Supporters' Shield: 2019
