= Adama Diomande =

Norwegian footballer (born 1990)

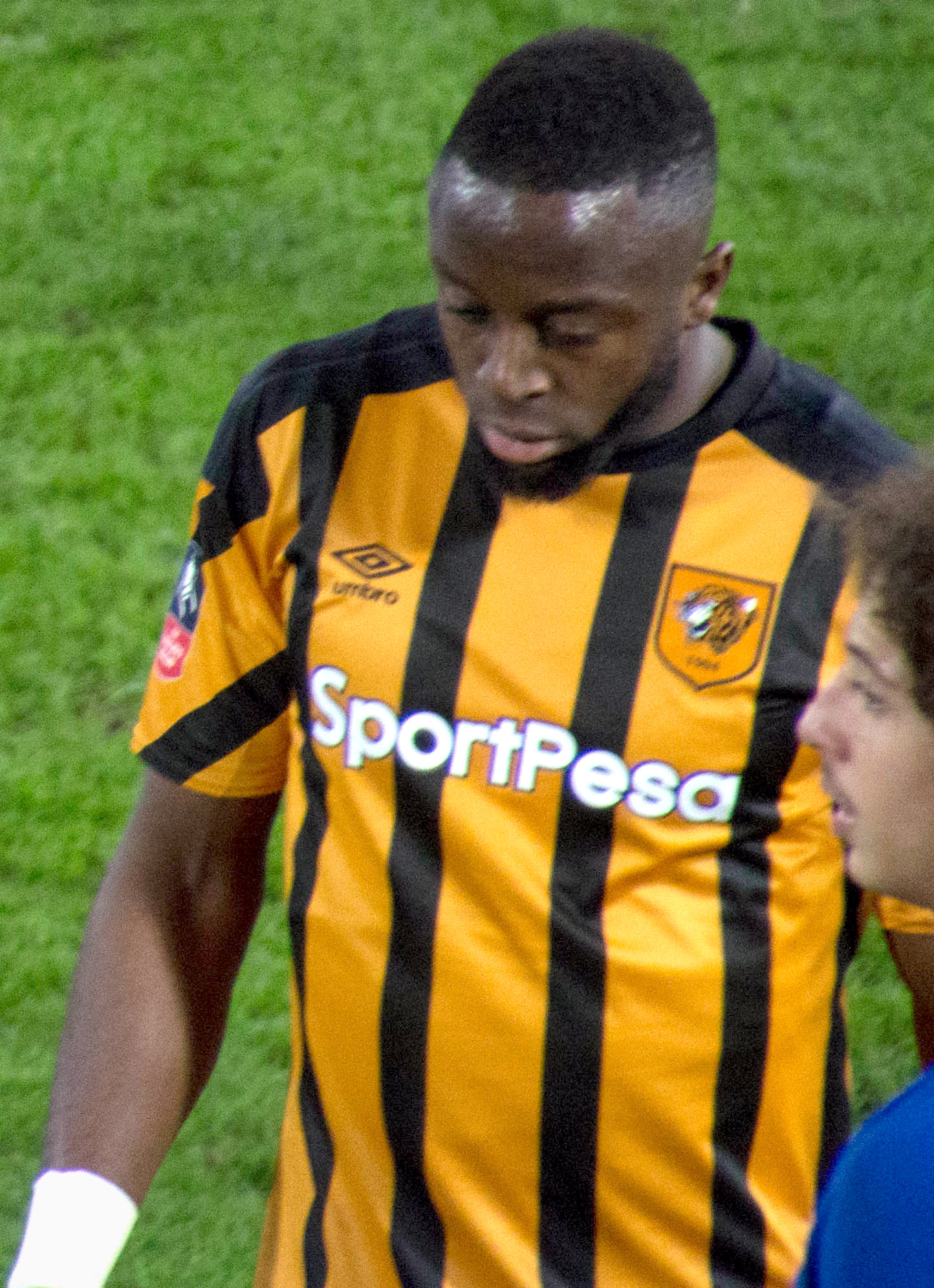
- Diomande playing for Hull City in 2018

Personal information
- Full name: Valentin Adama Diomande
- Date of birth: 14 February 1990 (age 36)
- Place of birth: Oslo, Norway
- Height: 1.80 m (5 ft 11 in)
- Position: Forward

Youth career
- Holmlia
- –2006: Vålerenga
- 2006–2008: Lyn

Senior career*
Years	Team	Apps	(Gls)
2008–2010	Lyn	3	(0)
2010	Skeid	12	(8)
2010–2011	Hødd	38	(18)
2012–2013	Strømsgodset	46	(15)
2014	Dinamo Minsk	23	(3)
2015	Stabæk	21	(17)
2015–2018	Hull City	49	(6)
2018–2020	Los Angeles FC	44	(20)
2021	Cangzhou Mighty Lions	4	(1)
2021	Al-Sailiya	9	(1)
2022	Al-Arabi	8	(4)
2022	Odd	2	(1)
2023	Toronto FC	5	(0)
2024	KFUM Oslo	1	(0)
2025–2026	Forte Virtus	5	(4)

International career^{‡}
2013	Norway U23	1	(0)
2015–2017	Norway	11	(1)
- * Club domestic league appearances and goals as of 25 October 2026 ‡ National team caps and goals as of 11:01, 10 June 2018 (UTC)

Valentin Adama Diomande (born 14 February 1990) is a Norwegian professional footballer who plays as a forward. He has previously played for Lyn, Skeid, Hødd, Strømsgodset, Dinamo Minsk, Stabæk, Hull City, Los Angeles FC, Cangzhou Mighty Lions, Al-Sailiya, Al-Arabi, Odd, Toronto FC, Oslo and Forte Virtus.

== Early life ==
Diomande was born in Oslo to parents from the Ivory Coast. He played youth football for the clubs Holmlia, Vålerenga, and Lyn. He has attended the sport secondary school Norges Toppidrettsgymnas, like most of Lyn's young players. He initially studied sports science at Ulsrud High School.

== Club career ==
Diomande made his senior debut on 19 October 2008 against Hamarkameratene, as a substitute in the 86th minute. He played one more game in 2008 and one in 2009. Ahead of the 2010 season he joined Skeid.

On 26 March 2015, Diomande signed a 2.5-year contract with Stabæk. Playing for head coach Bob Bradley in 2015, Diomande had his most productive season to date, scoring 25 goals in 26 appearances.

On 1 September 2015, Diomande joined English club Hull City of the Championship for a fee of £1.7 million. Because of injury, he had to wait until 12 December 2015 to make his debut when he came off the bench as a 77th-minute replacement for Chuba Akpom, in a 1–0 home win against Bolton Wanderers. Diomande made his Premier League debut on 13 August 2016, scoring a spectacular overhead kick in a shock 2–1 defeat of reigning champions Leicester City.

On 1 May 2018, Diomande signed with Major League Soccer club Los Angeles FC, reuniting him with Bradley in his first season at LAFC. Diomande made an immediate impact, scoring nine goals in his first seven league contests and being named MLS Player of the Month in his first full month on the squad.

On 13 August 2020, Diomande released a statement on Twitter that he was terminating his contract with LAFC "with immediate effect" for family reasons.

On 2 April 2021, Diomande joined Chinese club Cangzhou Mighty Lions.

On 8 August 2021, Diomande joined Qatari club Al-Sailiya.

In January 2023, he joined Toronto FC. Diomande made his debut for the club starting in a 3–2 loss at DC United in the season opener on 25 February 2023. After missing most of the 2023 season due to injury, he was waived by the club ahead of the 2024 season. On 30 August, he joined KFUM Oslo.

== International career ==
Diomande received his first international call-up to the senior team in June 2015, making his debut for the senior team on 12 June when he came on as a substitute for Joshua King in the 79th minute of a goalless UEFA Euro 2016 qualifying draw against Azerbaijan at Ullevaal Stadion.

== Career statistics ==
=== Club ===
As of match played 13 May 2023

Appearances and goals by club, season and competition
Club	Season	League			National cup		League cup		Continental		Other		Total	
Club	Season	Division	Apps	Goals	Apps	Goals	Apps	Goals	Apps	Goals	Apps	Goals	Apps	Goals
Lyn	2008	Tippeligaen	2	0	0	0	—		0	0	—		2	0
Lyn	2009	Tippeligaen	1	0	0	0	—		0	0	—		1	0
Lyn	Total		3	0	0	0	—		0	0	—		3	0
Skeid	2010	2. divisjon	12	8	2	1	—		0	0	—		14	9
Hødd	2010	2. Divisjon	10	4	0	0	—		—		—		10	4
Hødd	2011	Adeccoligaen	28	14	3	3	—		—		—		31	17
Hødd	Total		38	18	3	3	—		—		—		41	21
Strømsgodset	2012	Tippeligaen	21	7	3	1	—		—		—		24	8
Strømsgodset	2013	Tippeligaen	25	8	1	0	—		1	0	—		27	8
Strømsgodset	Total		46	15	4	1	—		1	0	—		51	16
Dinamo Minsk	2014	Belarusian Premier League	23	3	1	0	—		8	0	—		32	3
Stabæk	2015	Tippeligaen	21	17	5	8	—		—		—		26	25
Hull City	2015–16	Championship	11	3	4	0	0	0	—		—		15	3
Hull City	2016–17	Premier League	22	2	2	0	6	2	—		—		30	4
Hull City	2017–18	Championship	16	1	3	0	0	0	—		—		19	1
Hull City	Total		49	6	9	0	6	2	—		—		64	8
Los Angeles FC	2018	Major League Soccer	18	12	2	0	—		—		1 (Note: Appearances in MLS Cup Playoffs)	0	21	12
Los Angeles FC	2019	Major League Soccer	25	8	2	2	—		—		2	2	29	12
Los Angeles FC	2020	Major League Soccer	1	0	0	0	—		—		—		1	0
Los Angeles FC	Total		44	20	4	2	—		—		3	2	51	24
Cangzhou Mighty Lions	2021	Chinese Super League	4	1	0	0	—		—		—		4	1
Al-Sailiya	2021–22	Qatar Stars League	9	1	0	0	3	2	—		—		12	3
Al-Arabi	2021–22	Qatar Stars League	8	4	1	0	0	0	—		—		9	4
Odds	2022	Eliteserien	2	1	0	0	—		—		—		2	1
Toronto FC	2023	Major League Soccer	5	0	0	0	—		—		0	0	5	0
Career total			264	95	29	18	8	2	9	0	3	2	314	115

=== International ===
As of 10 June 2018

Appearances and goals by national team and year
National team	Year	Apps	Goals
Norway	2015	1	0
Norway	2016	9	1
Norway	2017	1	0
Total		11	1

Scores and results list Norway's goal tally first, score column indicates score after each Diomande goal.

List of international goals scored by Adama Diomande
No.	Date	Venue	Opponent	Score	Result	Competition
1	11 October 2016	Ullevaal Stadion, Oslo, Norway	San Marino	2–1	4–1	2018 FIFA World Cup qualification

== Honours ==
Strømsgodset

- Tippeligaen: 2013

Los Angeles FC

- Supporters' Shield: 2019

Individual

- MLS Player of the Month: June 2018
