= Latif Blessing =

Ghanaian footballer

Personal information
- Full name: Latif Atta Blessing
- Date of birth: 30 December 1996 (age 29)
- Place of birth: Accra, Ghana
- Height: 5 ft 7 in (1.70 m)
- Positions: Attacking midfielder; winger

Youth career
- 2013–2014: Liberty Professionals

Senior career*
Years	Team	Apps	(Gls)
2014–2016	Liberty Professionals	21	(17)
2017	Sporting Kansas City	25	(3)
2017	→ Swope Park Rangers	1	(1)
2018–2022	Los Angeles FC	145	(14)
2023	New England Revolution	15	(0)
2023–2024	Toronto FC	5	(0)
2023	Toronto FC II	1	(0)
2024	Houston Dynamo	27	(5)
2025–2026	Lexington SC	10	(0)
- * Club domestic league appearances and goals as of 12 July 2026

Latif Atta Blessing (born 30 December 1996) is a Ghanaian professional footballer who plays as an attacking midfielder or winger.

== Early life ==
Blessing was born in Nankese, a small village in the Suhum-Kraboa-Coaltar District of southeast Ghana.

== Club career ==
=== Ghana ===
In 2013, Latif Blessing joined the Liberty Professionals youth team in Accra. He was soon promoted to the senior club for the Ghana Premier League but mainly appeared on the bench for the side. Blessing received particularly good reviews for his performance during a Premier League match against Asante Kotoko on 21 June 2015. In that match, he scored in the 21st minute to equalize before providing two assists, leading Liberty Professionals to a 3–1 victory.

During the 2016 season, Blessing scored six goals in his first eight games. After his hat-trick on the final day of the season against Bechem United, Blessing would go on to finish the season as the top scorer in the league with 17 goals. His performance during the season was recognized in December 2016 when Blessing won the best player of the league award by the Ghana Football Association.

=== Major League Soccer ===
In January 2017, Blessing signed with Sporting Kansas City of Major League Soccer. He made his MLS debut on 11 March 2017 against FC Dallas. On 24 March 2017, Blessing was loaned to Swope Park Rangers, scoring in their match against OKC Energy FC. Blessing's first MLS goals came in a brace on 13 May 2017 in a 2–2 draw in Orlando versus Orlando City SC. On 20 September 2017, Blessing scored in the 2017 U.S. Open Cup Final, as Sporting Kansas City won the 2017 U.S. Open Cup.

In December 2017, Blessing was selected by Los Angeles FC with the second selection of the 2017 MLS Expansion Draft. He made his debut for the club as a starter in their first MLS match, a 1–0 victory at Seattle Sounders FC.

On January 3, 2023, Blessing was acquired by the New England Revolution for $400,000 in GAM for Los Angeles FC.

In July 2023, he was traded to Toronto FC for Mark-Anthony Kaye.

In March 2024, he was traded to Houston Dynamo FC for $75,000 in 2025 GAM and up to $200,000 in conditional 2025 GAM.

On 25 August 2025, Blessing joined USL Championship side Lexington SC. In July, 2026 Blessing and Lexington SC agreed to the mutual termination of his contract.

== International career ==
Blessing was included in the provisional squad for Ghana before the 2017 Africa Cup of Nations, but failed to make the final cut.

== Personal life ==
In 2017, Blessing obtained a U.S. green card allowing him to qualify as a domestic player for MLS roster purposes. However, in 2023, as part of the process to bring his family over via a visa, he had to give up his green card and reapply under a visa status, returning him to counting as an international player.

Blessing's brother, Ibrahim Fuseini, was a player of Lori FC in the Armenian Premier League from 2018 to 2019. He has a twin sister, Latifa.

== Career statistics ==
As of match played 21 October 2023

Appearances and goals by club, season and competition
Club	Season	League			National cup		Playoffs		Continental		Other		Total	
Club	Season	Division	Apps	Goals	Apps	Goals	Apps	Goals	Apps	Goals	Apps	Goals	Apps	Goals
Liberty Professionals	2016	Ghanaian Premier League	21	17	—		—		—		—		21	17
Sporting Kansas City	2017	Major League Soccer	25	3	5	3	1	0	—		—		31	6
Swope Park Rangers (loan)	2017	USL	1	1	—		—		—		—		1	1
Los Angeles FC	2018	Major League Soccer	30	5	4	2	1	0	—		—		35	7
Los Angeles FC	2019	Major League Soccer	34	6	3	0	2	0	—		—		39	6
Los Angeles FC	2020	Major League Soccer	21	1	—		1	0	5	1	2	1	29	3
Los Angeles FC	2021	Major League Soccer	30	2	—		—		—		—		30	2
Los Angeles FC	2022	Major League Soccer	30	0	3	0	0	0	—		—		33	0
Los Angeles FC	Total		145	14	10	2	4	0	5	1	2	1	166	18
New England Revolution	2023	Major League Soccer	15	0	1	0	—		—		—		16	0
Toronto FC	2023	Major League Soccer	5	0	—		—		—		2	0	7	0
Toronto FC II (loan)	2023	MLS Next Pro	1	0	—		—		—		—		1	0
Career total			212	35	16	5	5	0	5	1	4	1	242	42

== Honours ==
Sporting Kansas City

- U.S. Open Cup: 2017

Los Angeles FC

- MLS Cup: 2022
- Supporters' Shield: 2019, 2022
