= Eduard Atuesta =

Colombian footballer (born 1997)

- Atuesta with Orlando City in 2026

Personal information
- Full name: Eduard Andrés Atuesta Velasco
- Date of birth: 18 June 1997 (age 29)
- Place of birth: Vélez, Santander, Colombia
- Height: 5 ft 11 in (1.80 m)
- Position: Midfielder

Team information
- Current team: Orlando City
- Number: 20

Youth career
- Independiente Medellín

Senior career*
Years	Team	Apps	(Gls)
2016–2018	Independiente Medellín	29	(0)
2018	→ Los Angeles FC (loan)	25	(1)
2019–2021	Los Angeles FC	73	(6)
2022–2025	Palmeiras	50	(2)
2024	→ Los Angeles FC (loan)	28	(4)
2025–	Orlando City	54	(0)

International career^{‡}
2017	Colombia U20	7	(0)
2020	Colombia U23	6	(1)
2022	Colombia	2	(0)
- * Club domestic league appearances and goals as of 23:45, 7 November 2026 (UTC) ‡ National team caps and goals as of 19 November 2022

Eduard Andrés Atuesta Velasco (born 18 June 1997) is a Colombian professional footballer who plays as a midfielder for Major League Soccer club Orlando City.

Atuesta is a product of the Independiente Medellín academy, with whom he made his senior debut in 2016. In 2018, Atuesta was loaned to Major League Soccer club Los Angeles FC, and at the conclusion of the season he was acquired permanently. The following season, Atuesta helped Los Angeles FC win their first Supporters' Shield. In 2022, Atuesta transferred to Série A club Palmeiras, with whom he helped win that year's Recopa Sudamericana, Série A, and Campeonato Paulista titles.

Atuesta's playing time sharply declined after his initial success, and in 2024 he returned to Los Angeles FC on loan. While on loan with Los Angeles FC, he helped win the club's first ever U.S. Open Cup. Atuesta briefly returned to his parent club following the expiration of his loan, but signed with Orlando City in February 2025. In addition to his club career, Atuesta made two appearances with the Colombia national team in 2022.

== Club career ==
=== Independiente Medellín ===
Atuesta made his senior debut in the Copa Colombia when he started in a 5–1 victory over Envigado FC on 13 April 2016. Later that season, Atuesta made his league debut in the Torneo Finalización when he came on as a 55th-minute substitute for Juan David Cabezas in a 1–1 draw with Jaguares de Córdoba on 18 September. Three days later, Atuesta made his international debut in the Copa Sudamericana when he came on as a 63rd-minute substitute for John Édison Hernández in a 2–0 victory over Brazilian club Santa Cruz.

In the 2017 season, Atuesta became a regular starter for the club as Independiente Medellín were defending Torneo Apertura champions for the first time since 2004. Independiente Medellín made it to the final of the 2017 Copa Colombia, allowing Atuesta his first chance to win a trophy as part of the squad, but the club would lose 3–1 to Atlético Junior on aggregate.

In the 2018 season, Atuesta made just one appearance for the club, a 3–0 victory over Atlético Huila on 3 February.

==== Loan to Los Angeles FC ====
Atuesta signed with Major League Soccer club Los Angeles FC for their debut 2018 season on a season-long loan deal on 27 February 2018. Atuesta made his first appearance with LAFC in the inaugural El Tráfico derby on 31 March, when he was subbed in during a 4–3 away loss to the LA Galaxy. Atuesta scored his first goal for the club, the opening goal of a 2–0 win against Minnesota United on 9 May.

=== Los Angeles FC ===
On 13 December 2018, Los Angeles FC announced that they had signed Atuesta permanently on a three-year deal. On 21 April 2019, Atuesta scored his first goal as a permanent signing for the club, the second goal of a 4–1 win over the Seattle Sounders. Los Angeles FC qualified for the MLS Cup playoffs for the second season in a row, and the club secured their first Supporters' Shield, their first major trophy in club history. On 24 October Atuesta made his playoffs debut in an El Tráfico semi-finals derby against LA Galaxy, which LAFC won 4–2. LAFC saw their MLS Cup playoffs campaign end in a 3–1 defeat to the Seattle Sounders on 29 October, which saw Atuesta score the opening goal and mark his first playoffs goal of his career.

On 27 February 2020, Atuesta made his international debut with LAFC in the CONCACAF Champions League in a 3–0 victory over Club León which saw LAFC come back to win 3–2 on aggregate. In the semi-finals of the competition against Club América on 19 December, Atuesta received a red card in the 45th-minute as LAFC were up 1–0, but despite this LAFC went on to win the game 3–1 with the help of two goals from Carlos Vela in under two minutes. Atuesta's red card meant he would miss the final, which LAFC lost 2–1 to Tigres UANL.

On 4 August 2021, Atuesta was selected by Bob Bradley to the MLS All-Stars for a friendly match against the Liga MX All-Stars alongside teammates Diego Rossi and Jesús David Murillo. The game ended 1–1, with Murillo scoring an equalizing goal to see the game go to a penalty shoot-out, and in the subsequent penalty shoot-out Atuesta saw his attempt saved by Guillermo Ochoa, but the MLS All-Stars would win the shoot-out 3–2.

=== Palmeiras ===
Atuesta with Palmeiras in 2022

On 13 December 2021, Atuesta was sold to Série A club Palmeiras, where he signed a four-year contract. On 29 January 2022, Atuesta made his debut for the club in the Campeonato Paulista in a 1–1 draw with São Bernardo. Due to fixture congestion caused by the COVID-19 pandemic, Atuesta was able to play for Palmeiras in the 2021 FIFA Club World Cup which was played in February 2022. Atuesta made his international debut for the club in the competition on 8 February in a 2–0 victory over Al Ahly when he came on as a 86th-minute substitute for Zé Rafael. On 7 August, Atuesta scored his first goal for the club, the third of a 3–0 win against Goiás in Série A.

In the following 2023 season, Atuesta saw his playing time fall dramatically and he only made seven appearances across all competitions. In the 2024 season, Atuesta made just one appearance, an 81st-minute substitute appearance for Raphael Veiga in a 1–1 draw with Novorizontino in the Campeonato Paulista before departing.

==== Return to Los Angeles FC (loan) ====
On 8 February 2024, Atuesta was loaned back to Los Angeles FC for the 2024 season on a one-year loan with an option to buy. On 24 February, Atuesta marked his return to the club in a 2–1 victory over the Seattle Sounders. On 23 March, Atuesta scored his first goal since returning to the club, the final goal of a 5–0 rout of Nashville SC. Atuesta scored four goals and made six assists across the regular season. On 27 November, Los Angeles FC announced that Atuesta's loan had expired and that they were not pursuing a purchase. Following Atuesta's return to Palmeiras following the end of his loan, Atuesta made three appearances, all in the 2025 edition of the Campeonato Paulista.

=== Orlando City ===
On 10 February 2025, Atuesta was signed by Major League Soccer club Orlando City on a one-year contract with a club option for 2026. Atuesta made his debut when he started in the opening match of the season against Philadelphia Union which ended in a 2–4 loss. On 15 March, Atuesta provided an assist and a secondary assist in a 2–2 draw with the New York Red Bulls and for this performance he was named to the Team of the Matchday. On 25 June, Atuesta provided a hat-trick of assists in a 4–2 win at St. Louis City SC and for his performance he was named to the Team of the Matchday for a second time a day later. After the conclusion of Atuesta's first season with Orlando City, the team exercised his contract option.

On 19 February 2026, Atuesta signed a new contract that would see him contracted to the team until the 2028–29 season and included a club option for another season. On 22 July, Atuesta recorded three assists in a 4–0 win at the San Jose Earthquakes, a feat which would see him named to the Team of the Matchday for the first time that season.

== International career ==
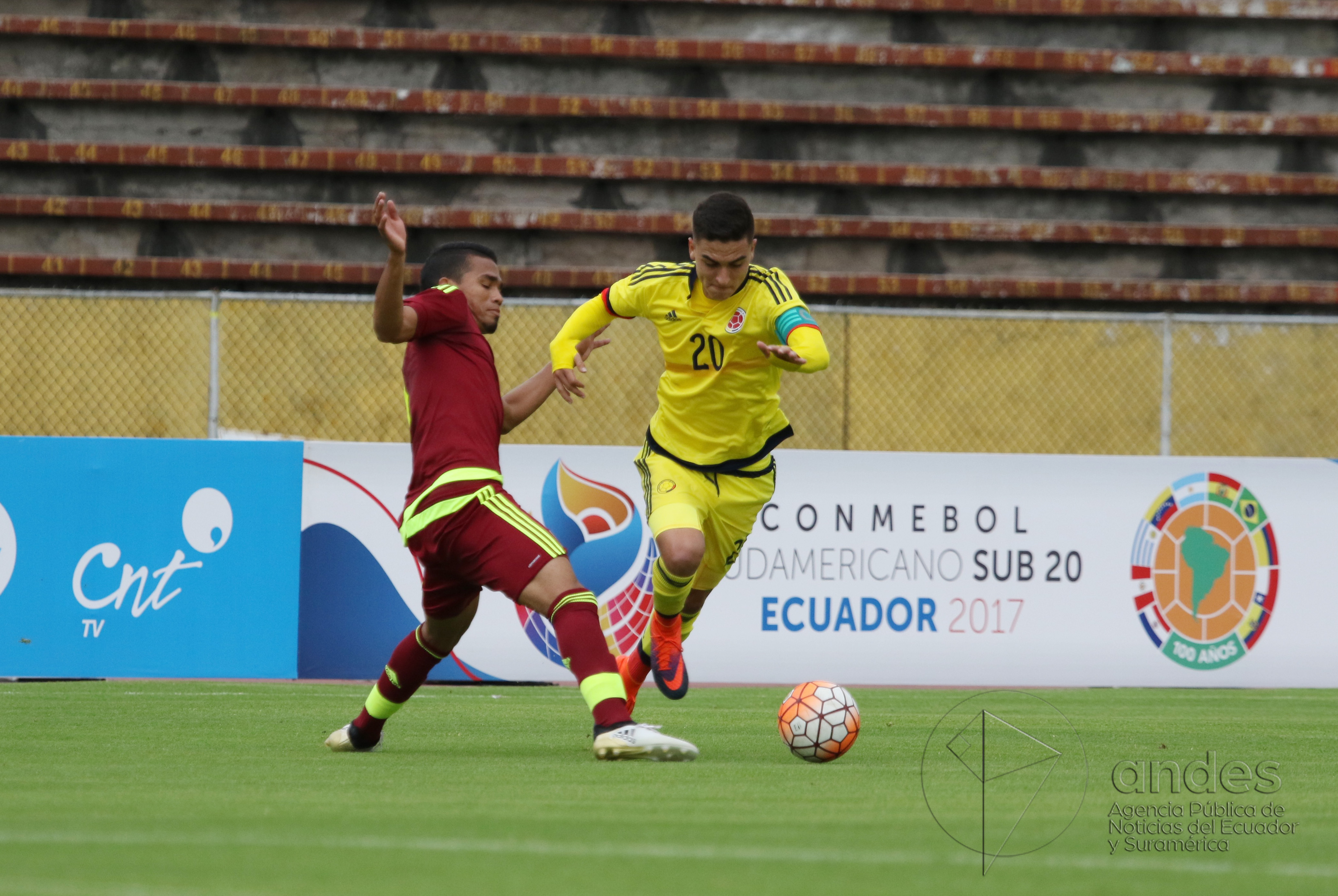
Atuesta playing against the Venezuela U20 in January 2017

Atuesta played for the Colombia under-20 national team at the 2017 South American U-20 Championship. In August 2019, he was called into the Colombia under-23 national team for friendlies against Brazil and Argentina.

== Personal life ==
Atuesta earned his U.S. green card in February 2019. This status also qualifies him as a domestic player for MLS roster purposes.

== Career statistics ==
As of match played 19 November 2026

Appearances and goals by club, season and competition
Club	Season	League			State league		National cup (Note: Includes Copa Colombia, U.S. Open Cup, and Copa do Brasil)		Continental		Other		Total	
Club	Season	Division	Apps	Goals	Apps	Goals	Apps	Goals	Apps	Goals	Apps	Goals	Apps	Goals
Independiente Medellín	2016	Categoría Primera A	4	0	—		6	0	1 (Note: Appearance(s) in Copa Sudamericana)	0	—		11	0
Independiente Medellín	2017	Categoría Primera A	24	0	—		7	0	1	0	—		32	0
Independiente Medellín	2018	Categoría Primera A	1	0	—		—		—		—		1	0
Independiente Medellín	Total		29	0	—		13	0	2	0	—		44	0
Los Angeles FC (loan)	2018	Major League Soccer	25	1	—		3	0	—		0	0	28	1
Los Angeles FC	2019	Major League Soccer	30	3	—		3	0	—		2 (Note: Appearance(s) in MLS Cup Playoffs)	1	35	4
Los Angeles FC	2020	Major League Soccer	19	1	—		—		3 (Note: Appearance(s) in CONCACAF Champions League)	0	1	1	23	2
Los Angeles FC	2021	Major League Soccer	24	2	—		—		—		—		24	2
Los Angeles FC	Total		98	7	—		6	0	3	0	3	2	110	9
Palmeiras	2022	Série A	26	1	13	0	2	0	7 (Note: Appearance(s) in Copa Libertadores)	0	4 (Note: Two appearances in FIFA Club World Cup and two appearances in Recopa Sudamericana)	0	52	1
Palmeiras	2023	Série A	1	0	6	1	0	0	0	0	0	0	7	1
Palmeiras	2024	Série A	—		1	0	—		—		—		1	0
Palmeiras	2025	Série A	—		3	0	—		—		—		3	0
Palmeiras	Total		27	1	23	1	2	0	7	0	0	0	63	2
Los Angeles FC (loan)	2024	Major League Soccer	28	4	—		3	0	—		10 (Note: Three appearance(s) in MLS Cup Playoffs and seven appearances in Leagues Cup)	0	41	4
Orlando City	2025	Major League Soccer	28	0	—		0	0	—		5 (Note: Four appearances in Leagues Cup and one appearance in MLS Cup playoffs)	0	33	0
Orlando City	2026	Major League Soccer	26	0	—		3	0	—		2 (Note: One appearance in Leagues Cup, one appearance in MLS Cup playoffs)	0	31	0
Orlando City	Total		54	0	—		3	0	0	0	7	0	64	0
Career total			236	12	23	1	27	0	12	0	20	2	321	15

== Honours ==
Independiente Medellín

- Categoría Primera A: 2016 Apertura

Los Angeles FC

- Supporters' Shield: 2019
- U.S. Open Cup: 2024

Palmeiras

- Recopa Sudamericana: 2022
- Campeonato Paulista: 2022, 2023
- Campeonato Brasileiro Série A: 2022, 2023
- Supercopa do Brasil: 2023
- FIFA Club World Cup runners-up: 2021

Individual

- MLS Best XI: 2019
- MLS All-Star: 2021
