= Walker Zimmerman =

American soccer player (born 1993)

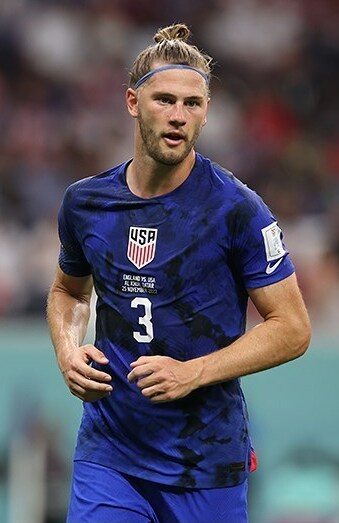
- Zimmerman with the United States at the 2022 FIFA World Cup

Personal information
- Full name: Walker Dwain Zimmerman
- Date of birth: May 19, 1993 (age 33)
- Place of birth: Lawrenceville, Georgia, US
- Height: 6 ft 3 in (1.90 m)
- Position: Center-back

Team information
- Current team: Toronto FC
- Number: 25

Youth career
- GSA Phoenix

College career
Years	Team	Apps	(Gls)
2011–2012	Furman Paladins	39	(11)

Senior career*
Years	Team	Apps	(Gls)
2013–2017	FC Dallas	89	(7)
2018–2019	Los Angeles FC	51	(5)
2020–2025	Nashville SC	147	(13)
2026–	Toronto FC	22	(1)

International career^{‡}
2010–2011	United States U18	3	(0)
2011–2013	United States U20	10	(2)
2015–2024	United States U23 (O.P.)	8	(1)
2017–	United States	46	(3)

Managerial career
- 2019: UCLA Bruins (assistant)
Medal record
Men's soccer
Representing United States
CONCACAF Gold Cup
Winner	2021 United States
Runner-up	2019 Costa Rica–Jamaica–United States
Runner-up	2025 Canada–United States
Men's soccer
CONCACAF Nations League
Winner	2023 United States
- * Club domestic league appearances and goals as of 03:41, September 20, 2026 (UTC) ‡ National team caps and goals as of July 2, 2025

Walker Dwain Zimmerman (born May 19, 1993) is an American professional soccer player who plays as a center-back for Major League Soccer club Toronto FC and the United States national team.

A native of Lawrenceville, Georgia, Zimmerman played two seasons in college with the Furman Paladins before signing a Generation Adidas deal with Major League Soccer. He was then selected in the 2013 MLS SuperDraft by FC Dallas as the 7th overall pick. Initially struggling for playtime due to injuries, Zimmerman established himself as a regular starter in 2016. He started in 38 matches as FC Dallas completed the double, winning the Supporters' Shield and the U.S. Open Cup. In December 2017, Zimmerman was traded to expansion side Los Angeles FC, helping the club win the Supporters' Shield in 2019. Zimmerman was also selected for the MLS All-Star team and MLS Best XI. Zimmerman was then traded to another expansion side, Nashville SC, in February 2020. With Nashville, he won back-to-back Defender of the Year awards in 2020 and 2021.

Zimmerman made his debut for the United States in January 2017 against Jamaica. In 2019, he was selected into the squad that finished runners-up in the CONCACAF Gold Cup. He was also a member of the squad that won the tournament in 2021, starting all three group stage matches before having to leave the tournament due to a hamstring injury.

== Club career ==
=== Youth and college ===
Zimmerman came through the youth academy at Gwinnett Soccer Association in Lilburn, Georgia, where he was mentored by former Atlanta Silverbacks and Charleston Battery manager Nuno Piteira. Zimmerman also went to Brookwood High School and played soccer there. He was coached by Daniel Klinect.

Zimmerman played college soccer at Furman University between 2011 and 2012. He was named First Team All-Conference 2011, Southern Conference Freshman of the Year 2011, and National Soccer Coaches Association of America NCAA Division I Men's All-America Second Team in 2012.

=== Professional ===
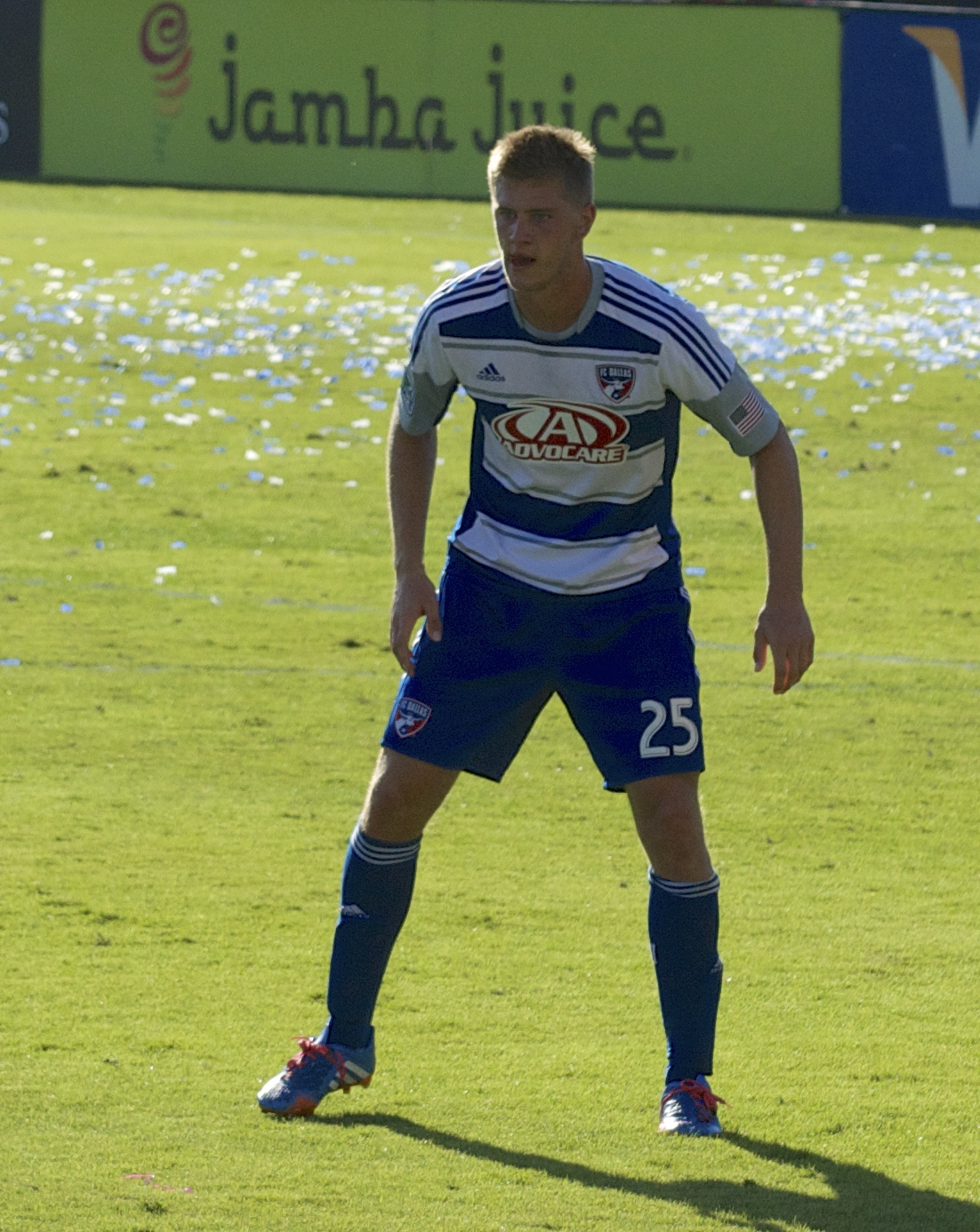
Zimmerman playing for FC Dallas in 2013

FC Dallas selected Zimmerman in the first round (No. 7 overall) of the 2013 MLS SuperDraft. He made his professional debut on May 11, 2013, as a late substitute in a 2–1 victory against D.C. United.

On December 10, 2017, Zimmerman was traded by FC Dallas to new expansion side Los Angeles FC in exchange for $250,000 in General Allocation Money and $250,000 in Targeted Allocation Money. The two clubs also swapped allocation rankings with FC Dallas moving to #1 and Los Angeles FC moving to #11. During the 2019 season, Zimmerman was also an assistant coach for the UCLA Bruins men's soccer program.

On February 11, 2020, Zimmerman was traded to Major League Soccer expansion club Nashville SC in exchange for up to $1.25 million in General Allocation Money and a 2020 international roster spot.

On February 29, 2020, Zimmerman scored the first goal in Nashville SC history.

On April 29, 2022, Nashville announced they had signed Zimmerman to a contract extension through 2025, and that it would also make him a Designated Player on their roster. The new contract made Zimmerman only the fourth American defender to be signed to a DP deal in league history. On April 5, 2025, Zimmerman suffered a head injury and was placed under the league's concussion protocols before returning to play on May 24, 2025. On November 12, it was announced Zimmerman would be leaving Nashville SC as a free agent.

On January 2, 2026, Zimmerman signed with fellow MLS side Toronto FC on a three-season contract.

== International career ==
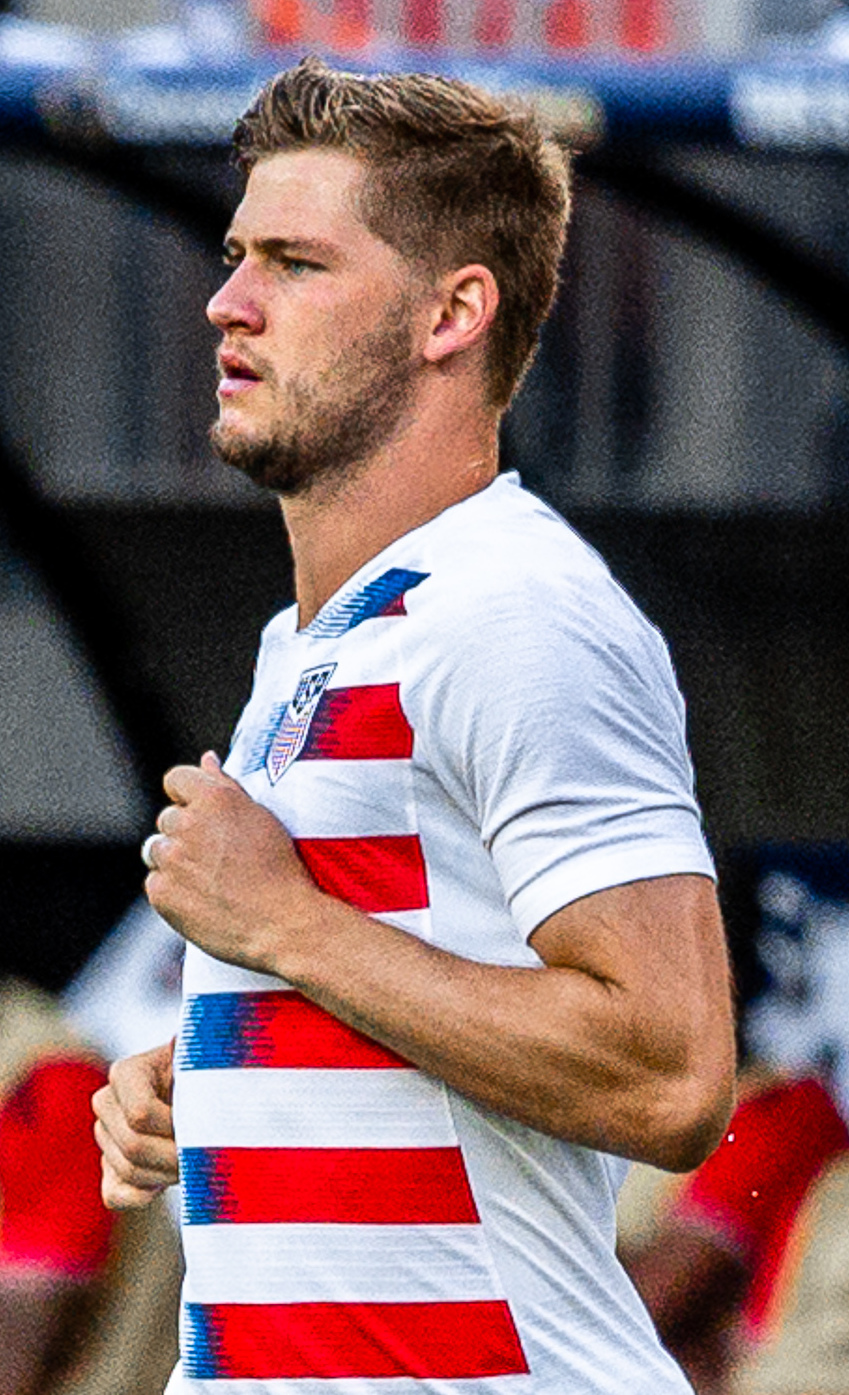
Zimmerman playing for United States at the 2019 CONCACAF Gold Cup

On January 6, 2017, Zimmerman was called up for the first time to the United States national team by coach Bruce Arena. Zimmerman earned his first cap and start against Jamaica in a January Camp friendly on February 3, 2017. He was named player of the match. He scored his first goal (a header) on May 28, 2018, against Bolivia. Zimmerman was called up for the 2022 FIFA World Cup, making appearances in all four matches. During the opening match against Wales, Zimmerman tackled Gareth Bale, the Welsh attacker, for penalty in the 82nd minute. Bale scored the penalty and tied the game. The game ended 1–1. According to ESPN, it was "a clumsy and unnecessary challenge".

== Personal life ==
Zimmerman was born in Lawrenceville, Georgia, on May 19, 1993, to Becky and David Zimmerman. He has two older siblings.

Zimmerman is a Christian. Walker is married to Sally Zimmerman. They have two children together.

== Career statistics ==
=== Club ===
As of match played September 19, 2026

Appearances and goals by club, season and competition
Club	Season	League			Playoffs		National cup		Continental		Other		Total	
Club	Season	Division	Apps	Goals	Apps	Goals	Apps	Goals	Apps	Goals	Apps	Goals	Apps	Goals
FC Dallas	2013	MLS	7	2	—		2	0	—		—		9	2
FC Dallas	2014	MLS	10	0	2	0	1	0	—		—		13	0
FC Dallas	2015	MLS	20	0	2	1	2	0	—		—		24	1
FC Dallas	2016	MLS	30	4	2	0	4	0	1	0	—		37	4
FC Dallas	2017	MLS	22	1	—		1	0	4	0	—		27	1
FC Dallas	Total		89	7	6	1	10	0	5	0	—		110	8
Los Angeles FC	2018	MLS	26	4	1	0	4	0	—		—		31	4
Los Angeles FC	2019	MLS	25	1	2	0	1	0	—		—		28	1
Los Angeles FC	Total		51	5	3	0	5	0	—		—		59	5
Nashville SC	2020	MLS	22	3	3	0	—		—		—		25	3
Nashville SC	2021	MLS	25	3	2	0	—		—		—		27	3
Nashville SC	2022	MLS	30	4	1	0	3	0	—		—		34	4
Nashville SC	2023	MLS	24	2	2	0	—		—		7	2	33	4
Nashville SC	2024	MLS	25	1	—		—		2	0	0	0	27	1
Nashville SC	2025	MLS	21	0	3	0	2	1	—		—		26	1
Nashville SC	Total		147	13	11	0	5	1	2	0	7	2	172	16
Toronto FC	2026	MLS	22	1	—		1	0	—		—		23	1
Career total			309	26	20	1	21	1	7	0	7	2	364	30

=== International ===
As of match played July 2, 2025

Appearances and goals by national team and year
National team	Year	Apps	Goals
United States	2017	1	0
United States	2018	3	1
United States	2019	7	1
United States	2020	2	0
United States	2021	10	0
United States	2022	14	1
United States	2023	5	0
United States	2024	0	0
United States	2025	4	0
Total		46	3

Scores and results list the United States' goal tally first, score column indicates score after each Zimmerman goal.

List of international goals scored by Walker Zimmerman
No.	Date	Venue	Opponent	Score	Result	Competition
1	May 28, 2018	Talen Energy Stadium, Chester, United States	Bolivia	1–0	3–0	Friendly
2	January 27, 2019	State Farm Stadium, Glendale, United States	Panama	2–0	3–0	Friendly
3	February 2, 2022	Allianz Field, Saint Paul, United States	Honduras	2–0	3–0	2022 FIFA World Cup qualification

== Honors ==
FC Dallas

- U.S. Open Cup: 2016
- Supporters' Shield: 2016

Los Angeles FC

- Supporters' Shield: 2019

Nashville SC

- U.S. Open Cup: 2025

United States

- CONCACAF Gold Cup: 2021
- CONCACAF Nations League: 2022–23

Individual

- MLS All-Star: 2019, 2021, 2022, 2023
- MLS Best XI: 2019, 2020, 2021, 2022, 2023
- MLS Defender of the Year: 2020, 2021
