= Rodrigo Pacheco (footballer) =

Argentine footballer

Personal information
- Full name: Rodrigo Nahuel Pacheco
- Date of birth: 15 August 1996 (age 30)
- Place of birth: Buenos Aires, Argentina
- Height: 1.78 m (5 ft 10 in)
- Position: Forward

Team information
- Current team: GS Marko

Youth career
- Lanús

Senior career*
| Years | Team | Apps | (Gls) |
| 2017–2020 | Lanús | 0 | (0) |
| 2017 | → Orange County SC (loan) | 7 | (1) |
| 2018 | → Los Angeles FC (loan) | 1 | (0) |
| 2019–2020 | → Barracas Central (loan) | 6 | (0) |
| 2020–2022 | Thesprotos | 28 | (8) |
| 2023–25 | GS Marko | 7 | (0) |
| 2024–25 | → Pallixouriakos (loan) | | |
- * Club domestic league appearances and goals

Rodrigo Nahuel Pacheco (born 15 August 1996) is an Argentine professional footballer who plays as a forward.

== Career ==
Born in Santa Fe, Argentina, Pacheco began his career in the youth ranks of Lanús. After spending time in the Lanús academy, Pacheco signed on loan with new Major League Soccer franchise Los Angeles FC in April 2017, and was immediately loaned to their United Soccer League affiliate Orange County SC for the remainder of the 2017 season.

On October 4, 2017, Pacheco scored his first goal as a professional, helping Orange County SC to a 3–1 victory over Sacramento Republic.

On 9 September 2020, Pacheco joined Thesprotos in Greece.
