= List of Los Angeles FC seasons =

Los Angeles FC is an American soccer club that has competed in Major League Soccer since joining as an expansion team in 2018. In addition to league play, the club has also played in the U.S. Open Cup, CONCACAF Champions League, and Leagues Cup. The following list is inclusive of all competitivehe club has partaken in.

== Key ==
Key to competitions

- Major League Soccer (MLS) – The top-flight of soccer in the United States, established in 1996.
- U.S. Open Cup (USOC) – The premier knockout cup competition in U.S. soccer, first contested in 1914.
- CONCACAF Champions League (CCL) – The premier competition in North American soccer since 1962. It went by the name of Champions' Cup until 2008.
- Campeones Cup (CC) – The premier knockout cup competition in U.S. soccer, first contested in 1914.
- Leagues Cup (LC) – An international club tournament contested between MLS and Liga MX teams, first held in 2019 but reformatted in 2023.
- FIFA Intercontinental Cup (ICC) – The premier club competition in the world, first contested in 2024 (after the reformatting of the FIFA Club World Cup).
- FIFA Club World Cup (CWC) – The premier club competition in the world that is held every 4 years, first contested in 2025.

Key to colors and symbols

1st or W	Winners
2nd or RU	Runners-up
3rd	Third place
Last	Wooden Spoon
♦	MLS Golden Boot
	Highest average attendance
Italics	Ongoing competition

Key to league record

- Season = The year and article of the season
- League = League name
- Pld = Games played
- W = Games won
- L = Games lost
- D = Games drawn
- GF = Goals for
- GA = Goals against
- GD = Goal difference
- Pts = Points
- PPG = Points per game
- Conf. = Conference position
- Overall = League position

Key to cup record

- DNE = Did not enter
- DNQ = Did not qualify
- NH = Competition not held or canceled
- QR = Qualifying round
- PR = Preliminary round
- GS = Group stage
- R1 = First round
- R2 = Second round
- R3 = Third round
- R4 = Fourth round
- R5 = Fifth round
- Ro16 = Round of 16
- QF = Quarterfinals
- SF = Semifinals
- F = Final
- RU = Runners-up
- W = Winners

== Seasons ==
Season	League									Position		Playoffs	USOC	International				Average attendance (Note: Average attendance only includes statistics from regular season matches.)	Top goalscorer(s) (Note: Top goalscorer(s) includes all goals scored in the regular season, MLS Cup Playoffs, U.S. Open Cup, MLS is Back Tournament, CONCACAF Champions League, FIFA Club World Cup, and other competitive continental matches.)	
Season	Pld	W	L	D	GF	GA	GD	Pts	PPG	Conf.	Overall	Playoffs	USOC	CCL	CC	LC	FCWC	Average attendance	Name(s)	Goals
2018	34	16	9	9	68	52	+16	57	1.68	3rd	5th	R1	SF	-	DNQ	-	DNQ	22,042	(Mexico) Carlos Vela	15
2019	34	21	4	9	85	37	+48	72	2.12	1st	1st	SF	QF	DNQ	DNQ	DNE	DNQ	22,251	(Mexico) Carlos Vela	38♦ (Note: Vela won the MLS Golden Boot (34 goals))
2020	22	9	8	5	47	39	+8	32	1.45	7th	12th	R1	NH	RU	DNQ	NH	DNQ	22,117 (Note: Attendance before COVID-19 restrictions)	(Uruguay) Diego Rossi	18♦ (Note: Rossi won the MLS Golden Boot (14 goals))
2021	34	12	13	9	53	51	+2	45	1.32	9th	19th	DNQ	NH	DNQ	DNQ	DNQ	DNQ	20,204	(Colombia) Cristian Arango	14
2022	34	21	9	4	66	38	+28	67	1.97	1st	1st	W	R16	DNQ	DNQ	EXH (Note: Los Angeles FC defeated Club América 6–5 in a penalty shootout after a 0–0 draw in the exhibition match.)	DNQ	22,090	(Colombia) Cristian Arango	21
2023	34	14	10	10	54	39	+15	52	1.52	3rd	8th	RU	R16	RU	RU	QF	DNQ	22,156	(Gabon) Denis Bouanga	32
2024	34	19	8	7	63	43	+20	64	1.88	1st	3rd	QF	W	DNQ	DNQ	RU	DNQ	22,122	(Gabon) Denis Bouanga	28
2025	34	17	8	9	65	40	+25	60	1.76	3rd	6th	QF	DNQ	QF	DNQ	LP	GS	21,931	(Gabon) Denis Bouanga	24
Total	260	129	69	62	501	339	+162	449	1.73	—	—	—	—	—	—	—	—	—	(Gabon) Denis Bouanga	101
