= 2019 Los Angeles FC season =

LAFC
2019 season
- General manager: John Thorrington
- Head coach: Bob Bradley
- Stadium: Banc of California Stadium
- MLS: Conference: 1st Overall: 1st
- MLS Cup playoffs: Conference finals
- U.S. Open Cup: Quarterfinals
- Top goalscorer: League: Carlos Vela (34); All: Carlos Vela (38)
- Highest home attendance: LFC 3–3 LAX; 22,757 (August 25)
- Lowest home attendance: LFC 2–0 DAL; 22,001 (May 16)
- Average home league attendance: 22,225
- Biggest win: 5–0 at SJ (March 30); 6–1 vs. VAN (July 6)
- Biggest defeat: 0–2 vs. MIN (September 1); 1–3 vs. SEA (October 29)
Home colors	Away colors

The 2019 Los Angeles FC season was the club's second season in Major League Soccer, the top tier of the American soccer pyramid. Los Angeles FC played its home matches at the Banc of California Stadium in the Exposition Park neighborhood of Los Angeles. Outside of MLS play, the team participated in the 2019 U.S. Open Cup tournament and qualified for the 2019 MLS Cup playoffs, reaching the conference finals.

== Squad ==
=== First-team roster ===
As of August 11, 2019.

No.	Name	Nat	Date of birth (age)	Games	Goals
Goalkeepers
1	Tyler Miller	(United States)	March 12, 1993 (age 33)	20	0
23	Pablo Sisniega	(Mexico)	July 7, 1995 (age 31)	4	0
40	Phillip Ejimadu	(United States)	August 31, 1999 (age 27)	0	0
Defenders
2	Jordan Harvey	(United States)	January 28, 1984 (age 42)	20	1
3	Steven Beitashour	(Iran)	February 1, 1987 (age 39)	19	1
4	Eddie Segura (Int)	(Colombia)	February 2, 1997 (age 29)	23	1
5	Dejan Jakovic	(Canada)	July 16, 1985 (age 41)	3	0
6	Danilo Silva (Int)	(Brazil)	November 24, 1986 (age 39)	3	0
13	Mohamed El Monir (Int)	(Libya)	April 8, 1992 (age 34)	8	1
19	Lamar Batista	(United States)	March 7, 1998 (age 28)	0	0
25	Walker Zimmerman	(United States)	May 19, 1993 (age 33)	18	1
27	Tristan Blackmon	(United States)	August 12, 1996 (age 30)	8	1
	Diego Palacios (Int)	(Ecuador)	July 12, 1999 (age 27)	0	0
Midfielders
7	Latif Blessing	(Ghana)	December 30, 1996 (age 29)	22	4
11	Peter-Lee Vassell (Int)	(Jamaica)	March 15, 1999 (age 27)	5	0
14	Mark-Anthony Kaye	(Canada)	December 2, 1994 (age 31)	20	4
15	Alejandro Guido	(United States)	March 22, 1994 (age 32)	0	0
20	Eduard Atuesta	(Colombia)	June 18, 1997 (age 29)	19	2
24	Lee Nguyen	(United States)	October 7, 1986 (age 40)	11	0
Forwards
9	Diego Rossi	(Uruguay)	March 5, 1998 (age 28)	23	12
10	Carlos Vela (Int)	(Mexico)	March 1, 1989 (age 37)	22	34
17	Brian Rodríguez (Int)	(Uruguay)	May 20, 2000 (age 26)	0	0
18	Joshua Pérez	(United States)	January 21, 1998 (age 28)	9	0
22	Rodolfo Zelaya	(El Salvador)	July 3, 1988 (age 38)	4	1
26	Adrien Perez	(United States)	October 13, 1995 (age 31)	6	0
99	Adama Diomande (Int)	(Norway)	February 14, 1990 (age 36)	16	7

=== Team management ===
Position	Staff
Lead Managing Owner	Larry Berg
Co-Managing Owner	Brandon Beck
Co-Managing Owner	Bennett Rosenthal
Executive Chairman	Peter Guber
President	Tom Penn
Vice Chairman	Henry Nguyen
Director	Ruben Gnanalingam
Director	Vincent Tan
EVP and General Manager	John Thorrington
VP and Asst. General Manager	Will Kuntz

Source: LAFC

=== Technical staff ===
Position	Staff
Head Coach	Bob Bradley
Director of Soccer Operations	Mike Sorber
Assistant Coach	Ante Razov
Assistant Coach	Kenny Arena
Goalkeeping Coach	Zak Abdel

Source: LAFC

== Transfers ==
=== Transfers in ===
Entry date	Position	Player	From club	Notes	Ref.
November 21, 2018	DF	(Colombia) Eddie Segura	(Colombia) Atlético Huila	Loan	
December 11, 2018	DF	(Libya) Mohamed El Monir	(United States) Orlando City SC	Traded for João Moutinho	
January 30, 2019	FW	(El Salvador) Rodolfo Zelaya	(El Salvador) Alianza F.C.	Transfer	
February 18, 2019	GK	(Mexico) Pablo Sisniega	(Spain) Real Sociedad	Transfer	
February 21, 2019	DF	(United States) Lamar Batista	(United States) Portland Timbers 2	Transfer	
February 21, 2019	GK	(United States) Phillip Ejimadu	(Brazil) Nacional Atlético Clube	Transfer	
February 21, 2019	FW	(United States) Adrien Perez	(United States) Ontario Fury	Transfer	
February 25, 2019	DF	(Finland) Niko Hämäläinen	(England) Queens Park Rangers	Loan	
February 27, 2019	MF	(United States) Alejandro Guido	(Mexico) Tijuana	Transfer	
March 1, 2019	MF	(Jamaica) Peter-Lee Vassell	(Jamaica) Harbour View	Draft pick signee	
March 10, 2019	MF	(Spain) Javier Pérez	(United States) Pittsburgh Panthers	Draft pick signee	
August 12, 2019	DF	(Ecuador) Diego Palacios	(Ecuador) SD Aucas	Transfer	

=== Transfers out ===
Exit date	Position	Player	To club	Notes	Ref.
December 11, 2018	DF	(Portugal) João Moutinho	(United States) Orlando City SC	Traded for Mohamed El Monir	
June 10, 2019	MF	(Portugal) André Horta	(Portugal) Braga	Transfer	
July 28, 2019	FW	(United States) Shaft Brewer Jr.		Mutually agreed to part ways	
August 7, 2019	FW	(United States) Christian Ramirez	(United States) Houston Dynamo	Transfer	
November 19, 2019	MF	(United States) Lee Nguyen	(United States) Inter Miami CF	2019 MLS Expansion Draft	

=== Draft picks ===
Round	#	Position	Player	College/Club Team	Reference
2	40	MF	(Jamaica) Peter-Lee Vassell	Harbour View F.C.	
3	64	MF	(Spain) Javier Perez	Pittsburgh	
4	73	MF	(Mexico) Kevin Mendoza	Liberty	

== Competitions ==
Win Draw Loss

=== Preseason ===
January 27, 2019	Los Angeles FC	3–1	Toronto FC	Irvine, California
	Horta; Rossi; Vassell (pen.)	Report	Moor	Stadium: University of California–Irvine

January 31, 2019	Los Angeles FC	4–1	Vissel Kobe	Los Angeles, California
7:00 pm	Vela 32', 42'; Jakovic 72'; Mendoza	Report	Hatsuse	Stadium: Banc of California Stadium; Attendance: 18,000

February 4, 2019	Los Angeles FC	2–4	Columbus Crew	Los Angeles, California
2:00 pm	(o.g.); Nguyen		Mullins; Williams, Meram	Stadium: Banc of California Stadium; Attendance: Closed

February 10, 2019	Los Angeles FC	2–2	Atlanta United FC	Los Angeles, California
1:00 pm	Perez 58'; Dia (yellow card) 72'; Vela 82'	LAFC Report; ATL Report	Martínez 18'; Gressel 29'	Stadium: Banc of California Stadium; Attendance: Closed

February 16, 2019	Los Angeles FC	0–3	San Jose Earthquakes	Los Angeles, California
	Segura (yellow card) 40'; Beitashour (yellow card) 57'	LAFC Report; SJE Report	Eriksson 15'; Wondolowski 30'; Godoy (yellow card) 40'; Lima (yellow card) 51'; Kashia (yellow card) 54'; Luis Felipe (yellow card) 77'; Vako 85'	Stadium: Banc of California Stadium; Attendance: Closed

February 23, 2019	Los Angeles FC	1–0	Vancouver Whitecaps FC	Los Angeles, California
	Vela 13'		Felipe (yellow card) 47'; PC (yellow card) 66'	Stadium: Banc of California Stadium

=== Major League Soccer ===
==== Standings ====
===== Western Conference =====
2019 MLS Western Conference standings
Pos	Team	Pld	W	L	T	GF	GA	GD	Pts	Qualification
1	Los Angeles FC	34	21	4	9	85	37	+48	72	Qualification for the conference semifinals
2	Seattle Sounders FC	34	16	10	8	51	49	+2	56	Qualification for the first round
3	Real Salt Lake	34	16	13	5	45	41	+4	53	Qualification for the first round
4	Minnesota United FC	34	15	11	8	52	42	+10	53	Qualification for the first round
5	LA Galaxy	34	16	15	3	56	55	+1	51	Qualification for the first round

Source: MLS
Rules for classification: 1) points; 2) total wins; 3) total goal differential; 4) total goals scored; 5) disciplinary points; 6) away goal differential; 7) away goals scored; 8) home goals scored; 9) home goal differential; 10) coin toss or drawing of lots

===== Overall =====
2019 MLS regular season standings
Pos	Team	Pld	W	L	T	GF	GA	GD	Pts	
1	Los Angeles FC (S)	34	21	4	9	85	37	+48	72	Qualification for the CONCACAF Champions League
2	New York City FC	34	18	6	10	63	42	+21	64	Qualification for the CONCACAF Champions League
3	Atlanta United FC (U)	34	18	12	4	58	43	+15	58	Qualification for the CONCACAF Champions League
4	Seattle Sounders FC (C)	34	16	10	8	52	49	+3	56	Qualification for the CONCACAF Champions League
5	Philadelphia Union	34	16	11	7	58	50	+8	55	

Source: MLS
Rules for classification: 1) points; 2) total wins; 3) total goal differential; 4) total goals scored; 5) disciplinary points; 6) away goals scored; 7) away goal differential; 8) coin toss or drawing of lots
(C) MLS Cup champions; (S) Supporters' Shield winners; (U) U.S. Open Cup winners

==== Results summary ====
Overall								Home						Away					
Pld	Pts	W	L	D	GF	GA	GD	W	L	D	GF	GA	GD	W	L	D	GF	GA	GD
34	72	21	4	9	85	37	+48	13	1	3	48	20	+28	8	3	6	37	17	+20

Last updated: October 6, 2019
Source: 2019 Major League Soccer season
Pld = Matches played; Pts = Points; W = Matches won; D = Matches drawn; L = Matches lost; GF = Goals for; GA = Goals against; GD = Goal difference

===== Results by round =====
Round	1	2	3	4	5	6	7	8	9	10	11	12	13	14	15	16	17	18	19	20	21	22	23	24	25	26	27	28	29	30	31	32	33	34
Stadium	H	H	A	H	A	A	H	A	H	A	H	A	H	A	H	A	A	A	H	A	A	H	A	H	A	H	H	H	A	A	H	H	A	H
Result	W	W	D	W	W	W	W	L	W	D	D	W	W	D	W	W	L	W	W	W	L	W	W	W	W	W	D	L	D	D	D	W	D	W

Updated to match(es) played on October 6, 2019. Source: Match reports
A = Away; H = Home; W = Win; D = Draw; L = Loss

==== Results ====
All times are Pacific.

March 3, 2019 1	Los Angeles FC	2–1	Sporting Kansas City	Los Angeles
5:30 pm	Rossi 47'; Harvey (yellow card) 66'; Blessing (yellow card) 81'; Atuesta (yellow card) 89'; Diomande 90+4'	Report	Gutiérrez (yellow card) 10'; Németh 16', (yellow card) 42'; Gerso (yellow card) 17'; Sinovic (yellow card) 27'; Espinoza (yellow card) 31' (yellow-red card) 84'; Zusi (yellow card) 51'	Stadium: Banc of California Stadium; Attendance: 22,099; Referee: Robert Sibiga

March 10, 2019 2	Los Angeles FC	4–1	Portland Timbers	Los Angeles
4:30 pm	Kaye 14'; Atuesta (yellow card) 17'; Ramirez 45'; Diomande 65'; Vela 68'	Report	Ebobisse 29'; Chará (yellow card) 35' (yellow-red card) 72'; Valentin (yellow card) 47'	Stadium: Banc of California Stadium; Attendance: 22,003; Referee: Jair Marrufo

March 17, 2019 3	New York City FC	2–2	Los Angeles FC	New York
12:00 pm	Mitriță 39', (yellow card) 90'; Sweat (yellow card) 55'; Ring 62'; Callens (yellow card) 64'; Chanot (yellow card) 88'; Sands (yellow card) 90+1'	Report	Rossi (yellow card) 41'; Vela 43', 76' (pen.), (yellow card) 73'; Kaye (yellow card) 90'	Stadium: Yankee Stadium; Attendance: 20,339; Referee: Armando Villarreal

March 23, 2019 4	Los Angeles FC	2–1	Real Salt Lake	Los Angeles
7:30 pm	Harvey (yellow card) 18'; Horta (yellow card) 22'; Rossi 40'; Zimmerman 90+2'	Report	Luiz (yellow card) 4'; Saucedo (yellow card) 24'; Kreilach 35' (pen.), (yellow card) 79'; Beckerman (yellow card) 55'; Portillo (red card) 84'; Herrera (yellow card) 90+3'	Stadium: Banc of California Stadium; Attendance: 22,023; Referee: Ismail Elfath

March 30, 2019 5	San Jose Earthquakes	0–5	Los Angeles FC	San Jose
12:30 pm	Espinoza (yellow card) 34'; Godoy (yellow card) 53'; Cummings (yellow card) 57'	Report	Vela 8', 45+3', 66'; Beitashour 26'; Kaye (yellow card) 30'; Atuesta (yellow card) 55'; Rossi 67'	Stadium: Avaya Stadium; Attendance: 18,000; Referee: David Gantar

April 6, 2019 6	D.C. United	0–4	Los Angeles FC	Washington
12:00 pm	Rooney (red card) 52'; Moreno (yellow card) 54'; Brillant (yellow card) 64'; Rodriguez (yellow card) 89'	Report	Vela 16'; Rossi 27', 32', 76'	Stadium: Audi Field; Attendance: 20,600; Referee: Robert Sibiga

April 13, 2019 7	Los Angeles FC	2–0	FC Cincinnati	Los Angeles
7:30 pm	Kaye 32'; Zimmerman (yellow card) 36'; Vela 90+3'	Report	Waston (yellow card) 30'	Stadium: Banc of California Stadium; Attendance: 22,323; Referee: Drew Fischer

April 17, 2019 8	Vancouver Whitecaps FC	1–0	Los Angeles FC	Vancouver
7:00 pm	Henry (yellow card) 19'; Hwang 27', (yellow card) 72'; PC (yellow card) 39'	Report	Danilo Silva (yellow card) 53'; El-Munir (yellow card) 80'	Stadium: BC Place; Attendance: 17,038; Referee: Ramy Touchan

April 21, 2019 9	Los Angeles FC	4–1	Seattle Sounders FC	Los Angeles
4:00 pm	Vela 12', 55'; Atuesta (yellow card) 35', (goal) 39'; Ramirez 61'	Report	Torres (yellow card) 22'; Kim (yellow card) 44'; Shipp 51'; Leerdam (yellow card) 58'; Delem (yellow card) 67'	Stadium: Banc of California Stadium; Attendance: 22,221; Referee: Baldomero Toledo

April 28, 2019 10	Seattle Sounders FC	1–1	Los Angeles FC	Seattle
12:30 pm	Morris 1'; Kee-hee (yellow card) 10'; C. Roldan (red card) 18'; Lodeiro (yellow card) 59'; Leerdam (red card) 90+5'	Report	Vela 4'; Kaye (yellow card) 18'; Blackmon (yellow card) 42'	Stadium: CenturyLink Field; Attendance: 38,581; Referee: Ted Uncle
Note: Roldan's red was rescinded on appeal.

May 4, 2019 11	Los Angeles FC	0–0	Chicago Fire	Los Angeles
7:30 pm	Beitashour (yellow card) 25'	Report	Corrales (yellow card) 25'; Schweinsteiger (yellow card) 41'; Frankowski (yellow card) 88'	Stadium: Banc of California Stadium; Attendance: 22,154; Referee: Fotis Bazakos

May 11, 2019 12	Columbus Crew	0–3	Los Angeles FC	Columbus
4:30 pm	Trapp (yellow card) 27'; Guzman (yellow card) 43'; Santos (yellow card) 54'	Report	Zimmerman (yellow card) 28'; Kaye 37'; Diomande 88'; Vela 90'	Stadium: Mapfre Stadium; Attendance: 18,048; Referee: Nima Saghafi

May 16, 2019 13	Los Angeles FC	2–0	FC Dallas	Los Angeles
7:00 pm	Vela 39'; Zimmerman (yellow card) 68'; Rossi 83'	Report	Acosta (yellow card) 63'	Stadium: Banc of California Stadium; Attendance: 22,001; Referee: Allen Chapman

May 19, 2019 14	FC Dallas	1–1	Los Angeles FC	Frisco
4:30 pm	Acosta (yellow card) 6'; Hollingshead 29'; Bressan (yellow card) 34'; Ziegler (yellow card) 46'; Hedges (red card) 49'; Hollingshead (yellow card) 82'	Report	Nguyen (yellow card) 55'; Miller (yellow card) 59'; Vela 80' (pen.)	Stadium: Toyota Stadium; Attendance: 15,135; Referee: Chris Penso

May 24, 2019 15	Los Angeles FC	4–2	Montreal Impact	Los Angeles
7:30 pm	Ramirez 7'; Vela 28'; Blessing 31'; Blackmon 55'; Zimmerman (yellow card) 83'	Report	Segura 70' (o.g.); Taïder 84' (pen.)	Stadium: Banc of California Stadium; Attendance: 22,444; Referee: Armando Villarreal

June 1, 2019 16	Portland Timbers	2–3	Los Angeles FC	Portland
7:30 pm	Mabiala (yellow card) 45+2'; Paredes 46'; Tuiloma (yellow card) 58'; Fernández 84', (yellow card) 90+9'; Blanco (yellow card) 85'	Report	Vela 6'; Rossi 34'; Blessing 54'; Atuesta (yellow card) 88'; Diomande (yellow card) 90+9'	Stadium: Providence Park; Attendance: 25,218; Referee: Robert Sibiga

June 28, 2019 17	Colorado Rapids	1–0	Los Angeles FC	Commerce City
7:00 pm	Wilson 49'; Price (yellow card) 73'; Bassett (yellow card) 75'; Mezquida (yellow card) 85'	Report	Nguyen (yellow card) 58'; Blackmon (yellow card) 61'	Stadium: Dick's Sporting Goods Park; Attendance: 15,968; Referee: Dave Gantar

July 3, 2019 18	Sporting Kansas City	1–5	Los Angeles FC	Kansas City
6:30 pm	Besler (yellow card) 14'; Sinovic (yellow card) 34'; Ilie (yellow card) 38'; Gutiérrez (yellow card) 48'; Croizet 85'; Melia (yellow card) 89'	Report	Ramirez 28'; Blessing (yellow card) 45'; Rossi 50'; Kaye (yellow card) 57'; Vela 63'; Beitashour (yellow card) 80'; Zelaya 89'; El-Munir 90+1'	Stadium: Children's Mercy Park; Attendance: 19,754; Referee: Kevin Stott

July 6, 2019 19	Los Angeles FC	6–1	Vancouver Whitecaps FC	Los Angeles, California
7:30 pm	Rose 35' (o.g.); Diomande 41'; Kaye 46'; Vela 54', 70'; Rossi 72'; Atuesta (yellow card) 80'	Report	Reyna 5' (yellow card) 48'; Godoy (yellow card) 7'; Montero (red card) 85'	Stadium: Banc of California Stadium; Attendance: 22,472; Referee: Allen Chapman

July 12, 2019 20	Houston Dynamo	1–3	Los Angeles FC	Houston
6:00 pm	Quioto 3'; Figueroa (yellow card) 83'	Report	Diomande 45+2', 49'; Jakovic (yellow card) 71'; Rossi 88'	Stadium: BBVA Compass Stadium; Attendance: 17,219; Referee: Armando Villarreal

July 19, 2019 21	LA Galaxy	3–2	Los Angeles FC	Carson
7:00 pm	Ibrahimović 8', 56', 70'; Polenta (yellow card) 21'; Dos Santos (yellow card) 35'; Araujo (yellow card) 61'; F. Álvarez (yellow card) 74'; Feltscher (yellow card) 84'	Report	Vela 4' (pen.), 90+7'; Atuesta (yellow card) 39'; Kaye (yellow card) 51'; Segura (yellow card) 74'	Stadium: Dignity Health Sports Park; Attendance: 27,088; Referee: Jair Marrufo

July 26, 2019 22	Los Angeles FC	4–3	Atlanta United FC	Los Angeles
7:00 pm	Diomandé 33'; Rossi 38'; Vela 42' (pen.); Atuesta 45'	Report	Adams 2'; Remedi (yellow card) 44'; J. Martínez 45+2'; Segura 51' (o.g.); González Pirez (yellow card) 56'; Meram (yellow card) 80'	Stadium: Banc of California Stadium; Attendance: 22,511; Referee: Ismail Elfath

August 3, 2019 23	New England Revolution	0–2	Los Angeles FC	Foxboro
4:30 pm	Zahibo (yellow card) 74'	Report	Rossi 8'; Zimmerman (yellow card) 66'; Blessing 72'	Stadium: Gillette Stadium; Attendance: 25,515; Referee: Rubiel Vazquez

August 11, 2019 24	Los Angeles FC	4–2	New York Red Bulls	Los Angeles
7:00 pm	Harvey 23'; Blessing 25'; Vela 61' (pen.); Segura 72'	Report	Parker (yellow card) 8'; Cásseres 42', (yellow card) 46'; Miller 45' (o.g.); Lawrence (yellow card) 48'; Muyl (yellow card) 76'	Stadium: Banc of California Stadium; Attendance: 22,342; Referee: Drew Fischer

August 17, 2019 25	Real Salt Lake	0–2	Los Angeles FC	Sandy
7:00 pm	Baird (yellow card) 6'; Everton Luiz (yellow card) 56'; Herrera (red card) 62'	Report	Zimmerman (yellow card) 17' (yellow-red card) 48'; Vela 64' (pen.); Diomande 82'	Stadium: Rio Tinto Stadium; Attendance: 18,213; Referee: Baldomero Toledo

August 21, 2019 26	Los Angeles FC	4–0	San Jose Earthquakes	Los Angeles
7:30 pm	Rossi 6'; Vela 17' (pen.), 41'; Blessing (yellow card) 65'; Blackmon (yellow card) 74'; Jo. Pérez 81'	Report	Jungwirth (yellow card) 19'; Godoy (yellow card) 35'	Stadium: Banc of California Stadium; Attendance: 22,110; Referee: Kevin Stott

August 25, 2019 27	Los Angeles FC	3–3	LA Galaxy	Los Angeles
7:30 pm	Blessing 12', 45+1'; Vela 53'	Report	Ibrahimović 2', 15', (yellow card) 84'; Pavón 16'; Skjelvik (yellow card) 28'; González (yellow card) 51'; F. Álvarez (yellow card) 81'; Carrasco (yellow card) 84'	Stadium: Banc of California Stadium; Attendance: 22,757; Referee: Allen Chapman

September 1, 2019 28	Los Angeles FC	0–2	Minnesota United FC	Los Angeles
7:30 pm	Blessing (yellow card) 90+3'	Report	Toye 25', 29'	Stadium: Banc of California Stadium; Attendance: 22,143; Referee: Armando Villarreal

September 7, 2019 29	Orlando City SC	2–2	Los Angeles FC	Orlando
4:30 pm	Nani 13', (yellow card) 45+4'; Michel 20'; Higuita (yellow card) 45+1'; Rosell (yellow card) 60'	Report	Perez 12'; Blessing (yellow card) 59'; Rossi 78'	Stadium: Orlando City Stadium; Attendance: 22,371; Referee: Alan Kelly

September 14, 2019 30	Philadelphia Union	1–1	Los Angeles FC	Chester
4:30 pm	Przybyłko 3'	Report	Vela 43'; Kaye (yellow card) 65'; Blessing (yellow card) 78'; Harvey (yellow card) 88'; Zimmerman (yellow card) 89'	Stadium: Talen Energy Stadium; Attendance: 19,145; Referee: Nima Saghafi

September 21, 2019 31	Los Angeles FC	1–1	Toronto FC	Los Angeles
7:30 pm	Beitashour (yellow card) 43'; Vela 90+5' (pen.)	Report	Endoh 19'; Laryea (yellow card) 90+1'	Stadium: Banc of California Stadium; Attendance: 22,022; Referee: Ted Unkel

September 25, 2019 32	Los Angeles FC	3–1	Houston Dynamo	Los Angeles
7:30 pm	Vela 23' (pen.); El-Munir (yellow card) 56'; Rossi 70', (yellow card) 80'; Atuesta (yellow card) 75', (goal) 82'	Report	Miller 28' (o.g.); Struna (yellow card) 33'; Vera (yellow card) 81'	Stadium: Banc of California Stadium; Attendance: 22,103; Referee: Ramy Touchan

September 29, 2019 33	Minnesota United FC	1–1	Los Angeles FC	St. Paul
4:30 pm	Toye (yellow card) 43'; Boxall 75'	Report	Vela 70'	Stadium: Allianz Field; Attendance: 19,706; Referee: Drew Fischer

October 6, 2019 34	Los Angeles FC	3–1	Colorado Rapids	Los Angeles
1:00 pm	Vela 28', 31', 51'; Harvey (yellow card) 58'; Kaye (yellow card) 73'; Nguyen (yellow card) 90+1'	Report	Kamara 40'; Price (yellow card) 62'	Stadium: Banc of California Stadium; Attendance: 22,537; Referee: Robert Sibiga

=== MLS Cup ===
October 24, 2019 Conference semifinals	Los Angeles FC	5–3	LA Galaxy	Los Angeles
7:30 pm	Vela 16', 40'; Rossi 66'; Diomande 68', 80'	Report	Kitchen (yellow card) 27'; Pavón 41'; Ibrahimović 55', (yellow card) 86'; Feltscher 77'; Alessandrini (yellow card) 89'	Stadium: Banc of California Stadium; Attendance: 22,902; Referee: Kevin Stott

October 29, 2019 Conference finals	Los Angeles FC	1–3	Seattle Sounders FC	Los Angeles
7:00 pm (PDT)	Atuesta 17'	Report	Ruidíaz 22', 64'; Lodeiro 26'; Leerdam (yellow card) 81'; Nouhou (yellow card) 90+3'	Stadium: Banc of California Stadium; Attendance: 22,099; Referee: Jair Marrufo

=== U.S. Open Cup ===
Los Angeles FC entered the U.S. Open Cup in the fourth round, along with the other 20 American MLS teams. The draw was announced on May 30, and matches took place on June 11/12.

June 11, 2019 4th Round	Real Salt Lake (Utah)	0–3	(California) Los Angeles FC	Sandy, Utah
8:00 pm MST	Beckerman (yellow card) 19'; Toia (yellow card) 49'; Luiz (yellow card) 55'	Report	Vela 8'; Nguyen 64'; Diomande 90+3'	Stadium: Rio Tinto Stadium; Attendance: 15,039; Referee: Victor Rivas

June 20, 2019 Round of 16	Los Angeles FC (California)	3–1	(California) San Jose Earthquakes	Los Angeles
7:30 pm	Rossi 35'; Diomande 60'; Atuesta (yellow card) 66'; Vela 66'	Report	Qazaishvili 7'; López (yellow card) 31'; Judson (yellow card) 52'; Thompson (yellow card) 90+1'	Stadium: Banc of California Stadium; Attendance: 14,028; Referee: Joe Dickerson

July 10, 2019 Quarter-finals	Los Angeles FC (California)	0–1	(Oregon) Portland Timbers	Los Angeles
7:30 pm PST	Segura (yellow card) 62'; Diomande (yellow card) 70'	Report	Blanco (yellow card) 34'; Mabiala (yellow card) 66'; Moreira (yellow card) 68'; Ebobisse 84'	Stadium: Banc of California Stadium; Attendance: 18,947; Referee: Alan Kelly

== Player statistics ==
=== Appearances and goals ===
Last updated on October 29, 2019

No.	Pos	Nat	Player	Total		MLS		U.S. Open Cup		MLS Cup playoffs	
No.	Pos	Nat	Player	Apps	Goals	Apps	Goals	Apps	Goals	Apps	Goals
Goalkeepers
1	GK	(United States) USA	Tyler Miller	30	0	28	0	0	0	2	0
23	GK	(Mexico) MEX	Pablo Sisniega	9	0	6	0	3	0	0	0
40	GK	(United States) USA	Phillip Ejimadu	0	0	0	0	0	0	0	0
Defenders
2	DF	(United States) USA	Jordan Harvey	35	1	28+2	1	3	0	2	0
3	DF	(Iran) IRI	Steven Beitashour	27	1	24+1	1	1	0	1	0
4	DF	(Colombia) COL	Eddie Segura	39	1	33+1	1	3	0	2	0
5	DF	(Canada) CAN	Dejan Jakovic	3	0	2	0	0	0	0+1	0
6	DF	(Brazil) BRA	Danilo Silva	7	0	2+3	0	2	0	0	0
13	DF	(Libya) LBA	Mohamed El Monir	16	1	4+11	1	0+1	0	0	0
25	DF	(United States) USA	Walker Zimmerman	28	1	25	1	1	0	1+1	0
27	DF	(United States) USA	Tristan Blackmon	23	1	15+3	1	2+1	0	2	0
Midfielders
11	MF	(Jamaica) JAM	Peter-Lee Vassell	6	0	2+4	0	0	0	0	0
14	MF	(Canada) CAN	Mark-Anthony Kaye	33	4	27+4	4	1	0	0+1	0
15	MF	(United States) USA	Alejandro Guido	0	0	0	0	0	0	0	0
20	MF	(Colombia) COL	Eduard Atuesta	35	5	30	4	3	0	2	1
24	MF	(United States) USA	Lee Nguyen	27	1	11+12	0	2	1	2	0
Forwards
7	FW	(Ghana) GHA	Latif Blessing	39	6	29+5	6	3	0	2	0
9	FW	(Uruguay) URU	Diego Rossi	39	18	33+1	16	3	1	2	1
10	FW	(Mexico) MEX	Carlos Vela	36	38	31	34	3	2	2	2
17	FW	(Uruguay) URU	Brian Rodríguez	9	0	5+2	0	0	0	2	0
18	FW	(United States) USA	Joshua Pérez	14	1	4+9	1	0+1	0	0	0
22	FW	(El Salvador) ESA	Rodolfo Zelaya	5	1	1+3	1	0+1	0	0	0
26	FW	(United States) USA	Adrien Perez	13	1	1+11	1	0	0	0+1	0
99	FW	(Norway) NOR	Adama Diomande	30	12	15+10	8	1+2	2	0+2	2
Players who have made an appearance or had a squad number this season but have left the club
8	MF	(Portugal) POR	André Horta	4	0	2+2	0	0	0	0	0
12	DF	(Finland) FIN	Niko Hämäläinen	2	0	1+1	0	0	0	0	0
16	MF	(Spain) ESP	Javier Pérez	1	0	0+1	0	0	0	0	0
21	FW	(United States) USA	Christian Ramirez	20	4	13+4	4	2+1	0	0	0
28	FW	(United States) USA	Shaft Brewer Jr.	1	0	1	0	0	0	0	0

=== Top scorers ===
Rank	Nat.	Player	Pos.	Major League Soccer	MLS Cup playoffs	U.S. Open Cup	TOTAL
1	(Mexico)	Carlos Vela	FW	34	2	2	38
2	(Uruguay)	Diego Rossi	FW	16	1	1	18
3	(Norway)	Adama Diomande	FW	8	2	2	12
4	(Ghana)	Latif Blessing	MF	6	0	0	6
5	(Colombia)	Eduard Atuesta	MF	3	1	0	4
5	(Canada)	Mark-Anthony Kaye	MF	4	0	0	4
5	(United States)	Christian Ramirez	FW	4	0	0	4
8	(Iran)	Steven Beitashour	DF	1	0	0	1
8	(United States)	Tristan Blackmon	DF	1	0	0	1
8	(Libya)	Mohamed El Monir	DF	1	0	0	1
8	(United States)	Jordan Harvey	DF	1	0	0	1
8	(United States)	Lee Nguyen	MF	0	0	1	1
8	(United States)	Adrien Perez	FW	1	0	0	1
8	(United States)	Joshua Pérez	FW	1	0	0	1
8	(Colombia)	Eddie Segura	DF	1	0	0	1
8	(El Salvador)	Rodolfo Zelaya	FW	1	0	0	1
8	(United States)	Walker Zimmerman	DF	1	0	0	1
Own goals				1	0	0	1
Totals				85	6	6	97

Updated to match played October 29, 2019
Source: Los Angeles FC
