= Xavi Tamarit =

Spanish football manager (born 1982)

- Tamarit in 2026

Personal information
- Full name: Xavier Tamarit Gimeno
- Date of birth: 6 February 1982 (age 44)
- Place of birth: Sedaví, Spain

Team information
- Current team: Los Angeles FC (interim head coach)

Managerial career
- Years: Team
- 2011–2012: Valencia Femenino
- 2026–: Los Angeles FC (interim)

Xavier Tamarit Gimeno (born 6 February 1982) is a Spanish football manager. He is the interim head coach of Los Angeles FC in Major League Soccer.

== Career ==
Tamarit was born in Sedaví and raised in Paterna, both in the Province of Valencia. He holds the UEFA Pro and CONMEBOL Pro licences, and graduated in sports science from the University of Valencia and completed postgraduate studies on elite football at the University of Porto. He gave up playing amateur football at 22, believing that dated training ideologies were causing him muscular injuries, and moved to study in Portugal, where his mentor Vítor Frade introduced to him the concept of "tactical periodisation".

Tamarit was assistant to Quique Hernández at Aris Thessaloniki and Levadiakos in Greece. In 2011–12, he had his first experience as a head coach, with Valencia Femenino. He started with nine consecutive defeats and was sacked on 25 January, with the team 16th of 18 and having 10 points from 18 games.

From 2012, Tamarit assisted Mauricio Pellegrino at Valencia, Estudiantes, Independiente, Alavés, Southampton, Leganés, Vélez Sarsfield, Universidad de Chile, Cádiz and Lanús. With the last club, he was part of the squad that won the Copa Sudamericana in 2025.

In January 2026, Tamarit moved to Los Angeles FC as assistant to Marc Dos Santos. On 1 October, he was named as interim head coach with six games remaining of the season in Major League Soccer, and the club in 6th in the Western Conference. Nine days later on his debut, the club drew 1–1 at home with leaders Vancouver Whitecaps, who had a player sent off after six minutes.
