= Henry Nguyen =

Vietnamese-American businessman

- Nguyễn Bảo Hoàng
- Born: 1973 (age 52–53); Vietnam
- Education: Harvard University, Kellogg School of Management
- Occupations: Venture capitalist, businessman
- Spouse: Nguyen Thanh Phuong (Nguyễn Thanh Phượng) (m. 2008)
- Father: Nguyễn Bá Bang

Henry Nguyen (Vietnamese: Nguyễn Bảo Hoàng; born 1973) is a Vietnamese-American businessman, entrepreneur, and venture capitalist.

== Early life ==
Nguyễn Bảo Hoàng's father, Nguyễn Bá Bang, was a deputy minister in the Ministry of Economy of the South Vietnamese government.

After Saigon fell under the control of the Communist Party of Vietnam in 1975, he fled to the United States with his wife, Kim Vu, and their children: their eldest son, Huy, daughters Thy and Linh, and Henry, who was 22 months old at the time. Henry grew up in Fairfax County, Virginia.

== Career ==
=== Early career ===
Nguyen worked at McDonald's during his youth in the United States.

His father, Nguyễn Bá Bang, founded Viaworld Internet Telecommunications Corp (VITC) in 2001 in partnership with Vietnam's state-owned telephone company. Henry traveled to Vietnam to establish the Hanoi office, where he stayed for four years.

=== Investment ===
After meeting Patrick McGovern, the chairman of IDG Ventures, Nguyen began managing a $100 million venture capital fund for IDG as part of IDG Ventures Vietnam, which has invested in over 45 companies, including VC Corporation, YAN Media Group, Vat Gia, and VinaGame. The fund continues to invest in four to six companies annually.

Nguyen brought Pizza Hut and Forbes to Vietnam. After studying its business model as part of his master's degree, he also worked for ten years to introduce the McDonald's brand to Vietnam, where the first restaurant opened in 2014. Nguyen is the chairman of Good Day Hospitality, the main franchisee for McDonald's in Vietnam.

=== Sport ===
Nguyen leads a consortium of 22 investors who own the Los Angeles Football Club. Other members of the investment group include Peter Guber, Tom Penn, Magic Johnson, Vincent Tan, Mia Hamm, Nomar Garciaparra, Chad Hurley, and Tony Robbins. He also has interests in both the Saigon Heat and the Vietnam Basketball Association.

=== Speaking ===
In May 2018, Nguyen spoke on the "Innovators Who Are Changing Asia" panel at the 2018 Milken Institute Global Conference.

== Personal life ==
Nguyễn Bảo Hoàng is married to Nguyễn Thanh Phượng, the chairwoman of Viet Capital Securities and the daughter of former Prime Minister Nguyễn Tấn Dũng. The couple have two children.
