= Eddie Segura =

Colombian footballer (born 1997)

- Segura with Los Angeles FC in 2026

Personal information
- Full name: Eddie Livington Segura Martínez
- Date of birth: 2 February 1997 (age 29)
- Place of birth: Pereira, Colombia
- Height: 1.78 m (5 ft 10 in)
- Position: Defender

Team information
- Current team: Los Angeles FC
- Number: 4

Youth career
- –2013: Deportivo Pereira

Senior career*
Years	Team	Apps	(Gls)
2013–2016	Deportivo Pereira	52	(1)
2017–2019	Atlético Huila	77	(2)
2019	→ Los Angeles FC (loan)	22	(0)
2019–2022	Los Angeles FC	63	(3)
2022	→ Las Vegas Lights (loan)	1	(0)
2023–	Los Angeles FC	63	(1)
2024–	Los Angeles FC 2	2	(0)

International career
2020	Colombia U23	6	(0)
- * Club domestic league appearances and goals as of 6 October 2025

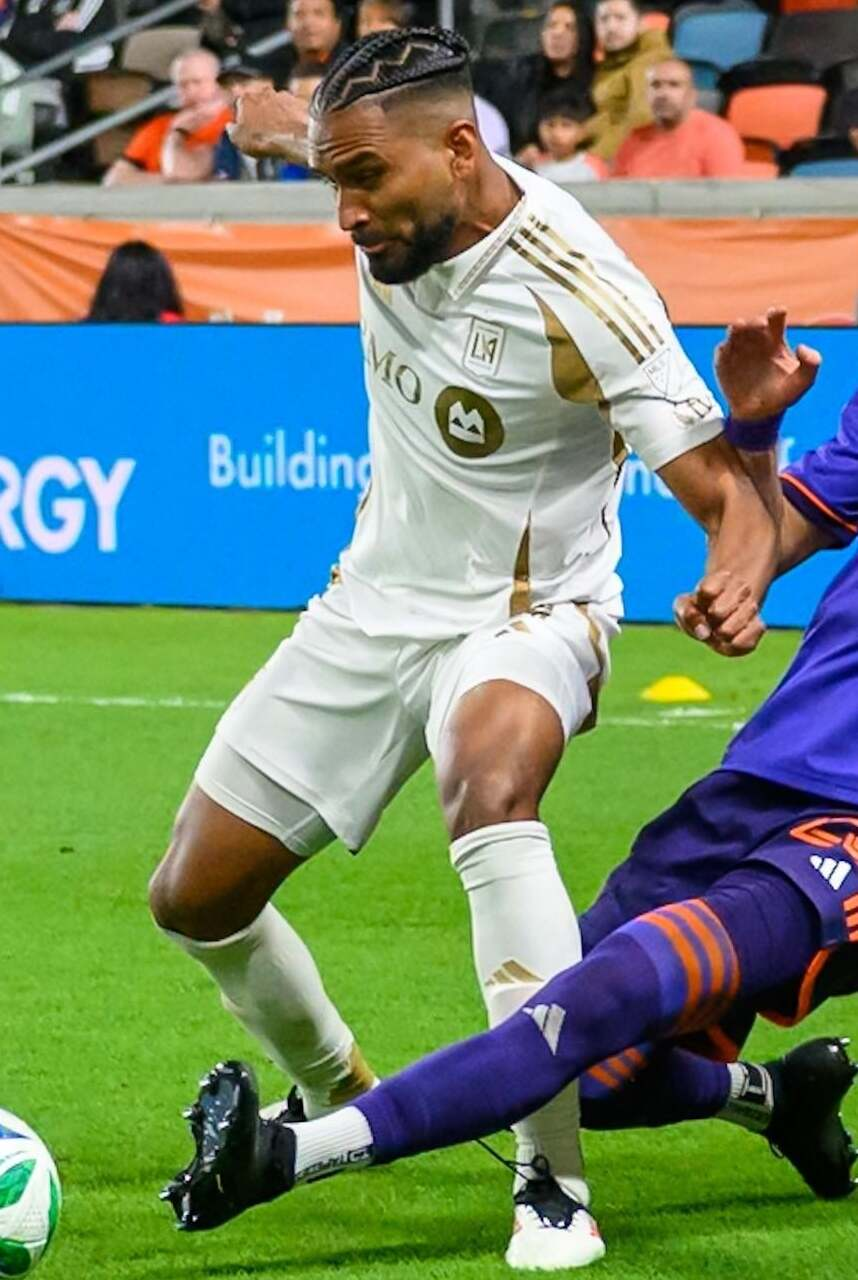
Segura with Los Angeles FC in 2025

Eddie Livington Segura Martínez (born 2 February 1997) is a Colombian professional footballer who currently plays as a defender for Major League Soccer club Los Angeles FC.

== Club career ==
Segura started his career with Deportivo Pereira and made his senior debut in Categoría Primera B as a 16-year-old on 5 May 2013, playing the whole match in a 4–2 win away at Universitario Popayán. In 2017, he joined Atlético Huila and played his first match in Categoría Primera A on 5 February 2017, in a 1–1 draw with Patriotas Boyacá.

On 21 November 2018, Segura joined MLS club Los Angeles FC on a six-month loan deal with an option to make the deal permanent. On 29 July 2019, Segura's move to Los Angeles was made permanent.

== International career ==
In November 2019, Segura received his debut international call-up, with the Colombia under-23 national team for a friendly against Japan.

== Career statistics ==
=== Club ===
As of match played 25 November 2020

Appearances and goals by club, season and competition
Club	Season	League			National cup		Continental		Other		Total	
Club	Season	Division	Apps	Goals	Apps	Goals	Apps	Goals	Apps	Goals	Apps	Goals
Deportivo Pereira	2013	Categoría Primera B	5	0	4	1	—		—		9	1
Deportivo Pereira	2014	Categoría Primera B	32	1	4	0	—		—		36	1
Deportivo Pereira	2015	Categoría Primera B	7	0	4	1	—		1 (Note: Appearance(s) in Playoffs promotion)	0	12	1
Deportivo Pereira	2016	Categoría Primera B	8	0	5	0	—		—		13	0
Deportivo Pereira	Total		52	1	17	2	0	0	1	0	70	3
Atlético Huila	2017	Categoría Primera A	36	0	3	0	—		—		39	0
Atlético Huila	2018	Categoría Primera A	41	2	—		—		—		41	2
Atlético Huila	Total		77	2	3	0	0	0	0	0	80	2
Los Angeles FC (loan)	2019	MLS	22	0	2	0	—		—		24	0
Los Angeles FC	2019	MLS	12	1	1	0	—		2 (Note: Appearance(s) in MLS Cup Playoffs)	0	15	1
Los Angeles FC	2020	MLS	22	2	—		5 (Note: Appearance(s) in CONCACAF Champions League)	0	1	0	28	2
Los Angeles FC	2021	MLS	15	0	0	0	—		0	0	15	0
Los Angeles FC	Total		71	3	3	0	5	0	3	0	82	3
Career total			185	6	23	2	5	0	4	0	217	8

== Honours ==
Los Angeles FC

- MLS Cup: 2022
- Supporters' Shield: 2019, 2022
- U.S. Open Cup: 2024
