= Los Angeles FC =

American professional soccer club based in Los Angeles

- Full name: Los Angeles Football Club
- Nicknames: The Black and Gold; The Black and Gold Falcons
- Short name: LAFC
- Founded: October 30, 2014; 12 years ago
- Stadium: BMO Stadium; Los Angeles, California
- Capacity: 22,000
- Managing owners: Bennett Rosenthal; Brandon Beck; Larry Berg
- Executive Chairman: Peter Guber
- President: Larry Freedman; John Thorrington
- Coach: Xavi Tamarit (interim)
- League: Major League Soccer
- 2026: Western Conference: 6th Overall: 13th Playoffs: TBD
- Website: lafc.com
Home colors	Away colors	Third colors

Los Angeles Football Club, also known as LAFC, is an American professional soccer club based in Los Angeles. The club competes in Major League Soccer (MLS) as a member of the Western Conference. It was established on October 30, 2014, and began play in the 2018 season as an expansion team. The team plays its home matches at BMO Stadium, a soccer-specific stadium located in Exposition Park.

The managing owners of the club are Brandon Beck, Larry Berg, and Bennett Rosenthal. Los Angeles FC also has a variety of other part-owners, such as Will Ferrell, Nomar Garciaparra, Mia Hamm, Giorgio Chiellini, and Earvin 'Magic" Johnson. The club's inaugural head coach was Bob Bradley, who served from 2017 to 2021 before being replaced by Steven Cherundolo.

During their second season in 2019, Los Angeles FC won the Supporters' Shield with club captain Carlos Vela earning the MVP Award. The club won their first MLS Cup in 2022, which completed a league double with their second Supporters' Shield. In 2020 and 2023, Los Angeles FC were also the runners-up in the CONCACAF Champions League. In 2024, Los Angeles FC won their first Lamar Hunt U.S. Open Cup.

The club within its short history has been home to notable players such as Gareth Bale, Olivier Giroud, Hugo Lloris, Son Heung-min, Giorgio Chiellini, and Carlos Vela.

== History ==
=== Founding and inaugural season (2014–2018) ===
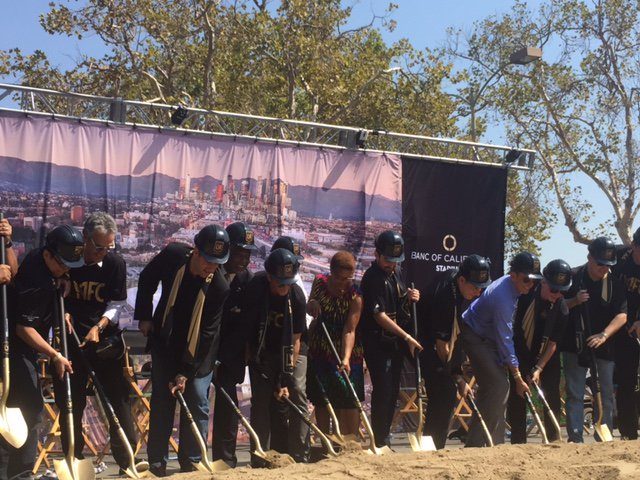
Groundbreaking ceremony for Banc of California Stadium (now BMO Stadium) in 2016

==== The founding ====
Los Angeles FC was founded on October 30, 2014, as a result of Major League Soccer (MLS) awarding a new expansion team to Los Angeles after the complete dissolution of Chivas USA. On September 15, 2015, the club announced that Los Angeles Football Club, which had previously been used as a placeholder name for the club, would be the official team name. Henry Nguyen, Los Angeles FC's principal owner at the time, hinted at this possibility shortly after the club was announced in describing the name as "timeless".

LAFC announced Bob Bradley as its head coach in July 2017, joining general director John Thorrington in a search for players. Mexican forward Carlos Vela was signed as the club's first designated player on August 11, 2017.

==== Inaugural 2018 season ====
On March 4, 2018, LAFC played its first MLS game, a 1–0 win against Seattle Sounders FC at CenturyLink Field in Seattle. LAFC designated player Diego Rossi scored the club's first competitive goal in the 11th minute, assisted by Vela. LAFC suffered its first MLS loss on March 31 against the LA Galaxy, losing 4–3 to their crosstown rivals in the inaugural edition of "El Tráfico". Despite the loss, LAFC won 4 of the 6 games on their road trip to start the season, becoming the first team to earn 12 points from a season opening road trip of 6 games or more. They finished the season with 7 road wins which is the most for an expansion team in the post-shootout era.

LAFC accomplished the best regular season for an MLS expansion team, earning 57 points. The total surpassed the 56 picked up by the 1998 Chicago Fire, also coached by Bob Bradley, as well as the post-shootout era record of 55 set in 2017 by Atlanta United FC. LAFC's seven road wins also tied for the most ever by an expansion team in the pre or post shootout-era with the '98 Fire who had two road wins come via the shootout. They finished second all-time in goals scored by an expansion team in a season, with 68, just behind Atlanta's 70.

On October 6, 2018, LAFC clinched its first playoff spot after a 3–0 victory against the Colorado Rapids finishing third in the West, but were knocked out at home in the first round in a 3–2 loss to sixth-place Real Salt Lake.

=== First Supporters' Shield title and pandemic seasons (2019–2021) ===
==== 2019 season ====
LAFC won the 2019 Supporters' Shield with a record-setting 72 points; Carlos Vela won the MLS Golden Boot with a league-record 34 goals and was also named the league MVP. In the playoffs, LAFC defeated their El Trafico rivals LA Galaxy for the first time 5–3 in the Western Conference Semifinal. In the Western Conference Final, LAFC were eliminated in an upset loss at home by Cascadia rivals Seattle Sounders 3–1.

==== 2020 season ====
The 2020 MLS season was suspended in March due to the COVID-19 pandemic and resumed with the MLS is Back Tournament, a special tournament with all teams at the ESPN Wide World of Sports Complex in Orlando, Florida. In the group stage, LAFC earned five points and qualified for the knockout rounds. The team defeated Seattle Sounders FC but lost to Orlando City SC in a penalty shoutout. The regular season resumed after the tournament with matches played behind closed doors. LAFC saw 47 goals with 14 coming from Golden Boot winner Diego Rossi. The team finished with a 9–8–5 and were eliminated in the playoffs by Seattle Sounders FC.

==== 2020 CONCACAF Champions League ====
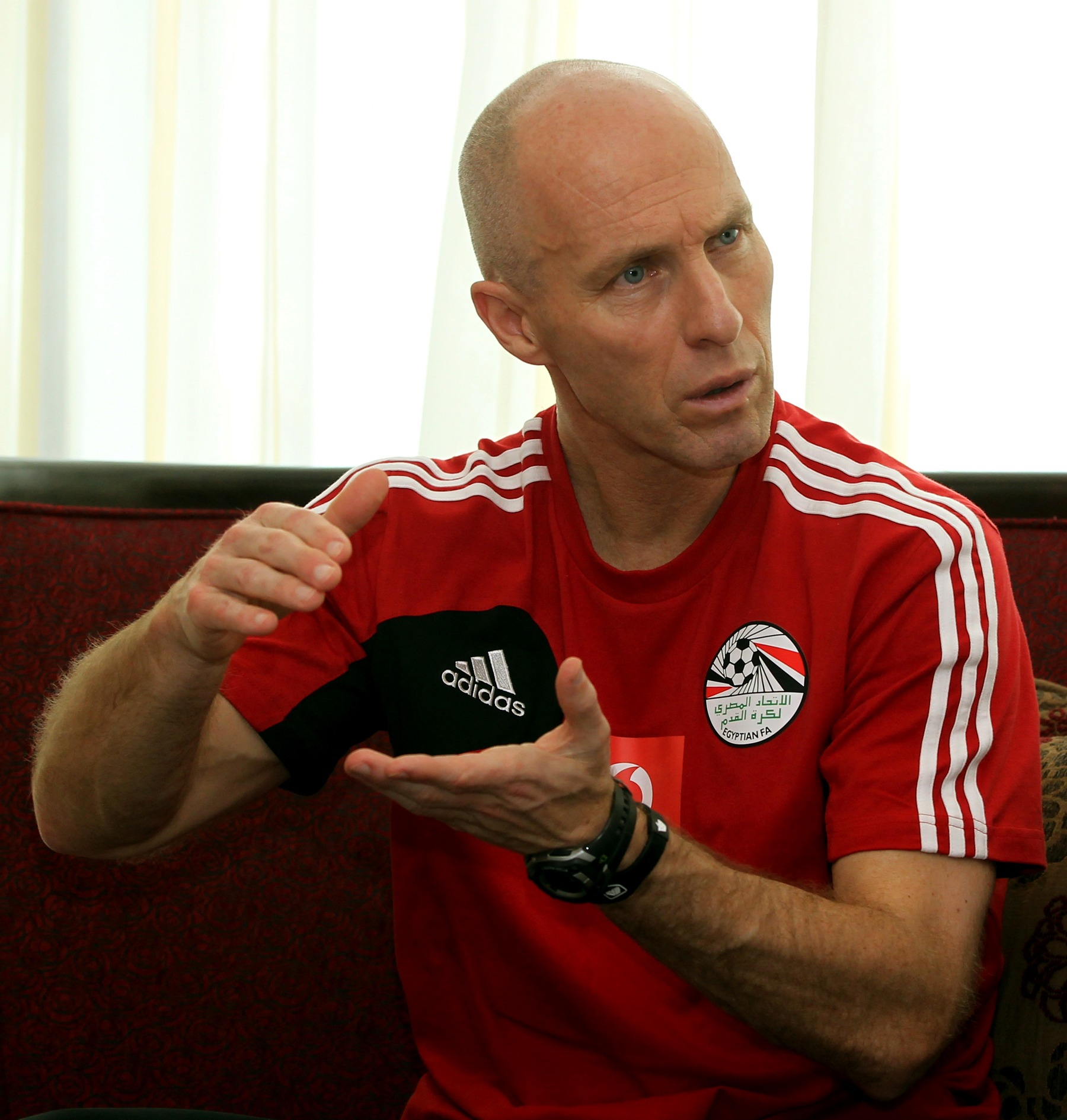
Bob Bradley, head coach of LAFC from July 17, 2017, to November 18, 2021.

Los Angeles FC qualified for CONCACAF Champions League for the first time in 2020. After going down 2–0 in the first leg against Club León, LAFC came back and won 3–0 in the second leg, advancing (3–2 on aggregate) to the round of 16. Shortly after that, due to the COVID-19 pandemic, the tournament was put on hold. When the tournament resumed in December, under a new one-off format, Los Angeles FC defeated Cruz Azul (2–1) after going down 1–0. In the semi-finals LAFC defeated Club América (3–1), again in comeback fashion. They became the third MLS side to advance to the Final, where they were defeated by Tigres UANL (2–1), who had been runners-up in previous editions of the tournament, and who went on to become the runners-up in the Club World Cup.

==== 2021 season ====
LAFC rebuilt their roster for much of the 2021 MLS season and missed the MLS Cup playoffs. Diego Rossi was transferred to Fenerbahçe S.K. in September 2021. Carlos Vela was injured for most of the year and only appeared in 27 matches during the 2020 and 2021 seasons. After missing the playoffs, Bob Bradley was fired as head coach on November 18, 2021. He was replaced by Steve Cherundolo, the head coach of the team's USL affiliate Las Vegas Lights FC, on January 3, 2022.

==== MLS Cup championship (2022) ====
Starting XI for 2022 MLS Cup

LAFC spent the majority of the 2022 MLS season pushing for the league's all-time points record (73, set the previous year), but had five losses in their final nine matches. The team finished with 67 points and won their second Supporters' Shield, but fell short of the record. This total was equal with the Philadelphia Union, who lost the Shield on a wins tiebreaker. LAFC defeated the Galaxy 3–2 in the conference semifinals before knocking out Austin FC 3–0 to advance to their first MLS Cup.

Los Angeles FC won the 2022 MLS Cup by defeating the Union in a penalty shootout following a 3–3 draw through extra time. The two latest goals in MLS Cup Playoffs history were scored in the match, with Gareth Bale scoring an equalizer in the 128th minute to take the match to penalties, which LAFC won 3–0. LAFC substitute goalkeeper John McCarthy made two saves in the shootout and was named the most valuable player of the match.

=== Recent seasons (2023–present) ===
==== 2023 season ====
Coming out of the successes of the 2022 campaign, Los Angeles FC had qualified to the 2023 CONCACAF Champions League. The team had a congested schedule with the Champions League and U.S. Open Cup taking most of the breaks from regular season play in the first half of the season. MLS also had introduced the Leagues Cup. LAFC finished as runners-up in MLS Cup 2023 to the Columbus Crew and the CONCACAF Champions League to Club León. The team traveled over 63,000 miles (101,000 km) over the course of the season and played 53 matches—a record at the time for an MLS team during a single year.

==== 2023 CONCACAF Champions League ====
During the team's 2023 season, Los Angeles had advanced to the 2023 CONCACAF Champions League final for the club's second time in four years. Their road to the finals consisted of victories against Alajuelense, Vancouver Whitecaps FC, and Philadelphia Union. Los Angeles FC would face Club León in the final, who the team had faced before in the 2020 tournament. Los Angeles FC were the favorites, heading to the final. In the first leg, Leon would win 2–1 with a late goal by Denis Bouanga to keep the hope alive for Los Angeles FC. In the second leg, Los Angeles FC fell flat and would lose the match against Leon 1–0 and lose on aggregate 3–1.

==== 2024 season ====
With the 2024 season, LAFC acquired Lewis O'Brien, Eduard Atuesta, Olivier Giroud, Hugo Lloris, David Martínez, Kei Kamara, and Maxime Chanot in response to the departures of Maxime Crépeau, Carlos Vela (The club negotiated a small contract at the end of the season), Denil Maldonado, Giorgio Chiellini, Kellyn Acosta, Filip Krastev, Diego Palacios, and Stipe Biuk. The team was able to clinch the Western Conference (Regular season) by goal difference against the LA Galaxy. LAFC had a rocky start to its season dealing with a first loss of the season against Real Salt Lake in a snow game 3–0. By the middle of the season, LAFC saw an unbeaten streak of 13 games. That streak would end with a defeat by the Columbus Crew 5–1. LAFC would reach the final of the 2024 Leagues Cup getting out of the group stage against Vancouver Whitecaps FC and Club Tijuana and then knocking out Austin FC, San Jose Earthquakes, Seattle Sounders FC, and Colorado Rapids. In the final they would face Columbus Crew once again losing 3–1. After the Leagues Cup tournament, LAFC would go on to lose against Houston Dynamo FC, LA Galaxy, and FC Dallas in the 2nd half of the regular season. In the 2024 MLS Cup playoffs after knocking out Vancouver Whitecaps FC in the Best of Three Round, LAFC faced Seattle Sounders FC. The match would go on to extra-time where Seattle Sounders would eventually defeat LAFC 2–1 ending LAFC's 2024 season.

==== U.S. Open Cup title (2024) ====
LAFC qualified to the 2024 U.S. Open Cup and began their campaign in the Round of 32. Their first opponent was against USL Championship side Las Vegas Lights FC where after chippy play, LAFC came out victorious 3–1 at Cashman Field. In the Round of 16, LAFC played at home as they faced USL Championship side Loudoun United FC. LAFC easily beat the team 3–0 to move on to the Quarter-finals. Their next opponent, was the leading USL Championship side New Mexico United. LAFC would go on to win the match 3–1. The Semifinal round brought LAFC to play against their rivals Seattle Sounders FC. The match was very defensive with no goals until Denis Bouanga scored a penalty kick on the 83rd minute securing a LAFC win. With the victory, LAFC would be the third team along with San Jose Earthquakes and Portland Timbers to beat the Seattle Sounders at the 5,000 seater Starfire Sports Complex where the Sounders had a fortress record of 25–1–3.

As a result of winning against Seattle Sounders, Los Angeles FC would advance to the U.S. Open Cup Final to face Sporting Kansas City at home. The first half of the final would see both sides not scoring. That would change in the 2nd half as Olivier Giroud at the 53rd minute would take a successful header from a cross by Mateusz Bogusz to make it 1–0. At the 60th minute Sporting Kansas would respond with a goal by Erik Thommy making it 1–1. The game would go on to extra time where at the 102nd minute Omar Campos would take a shot after beating a defender to make it 2–1. Kansas City would not recover especially after Kei Kamara would take a header to make it 3–1 at the 109th minute. LAFC would then go on to win the 2024 U.S. Open Cup becoming the fourth team from the Los Angeles area to win the U.S. Open Cup, following the Los Angeles Kickers, Maccabee Los Angeles, and LA Galaxy.

The Dewar Cup Trophy was presented by three members of the Los Angeles Kickers, an amateur team that won the 1958 and 1964 editions of the tournament.

==== 2025 season ====
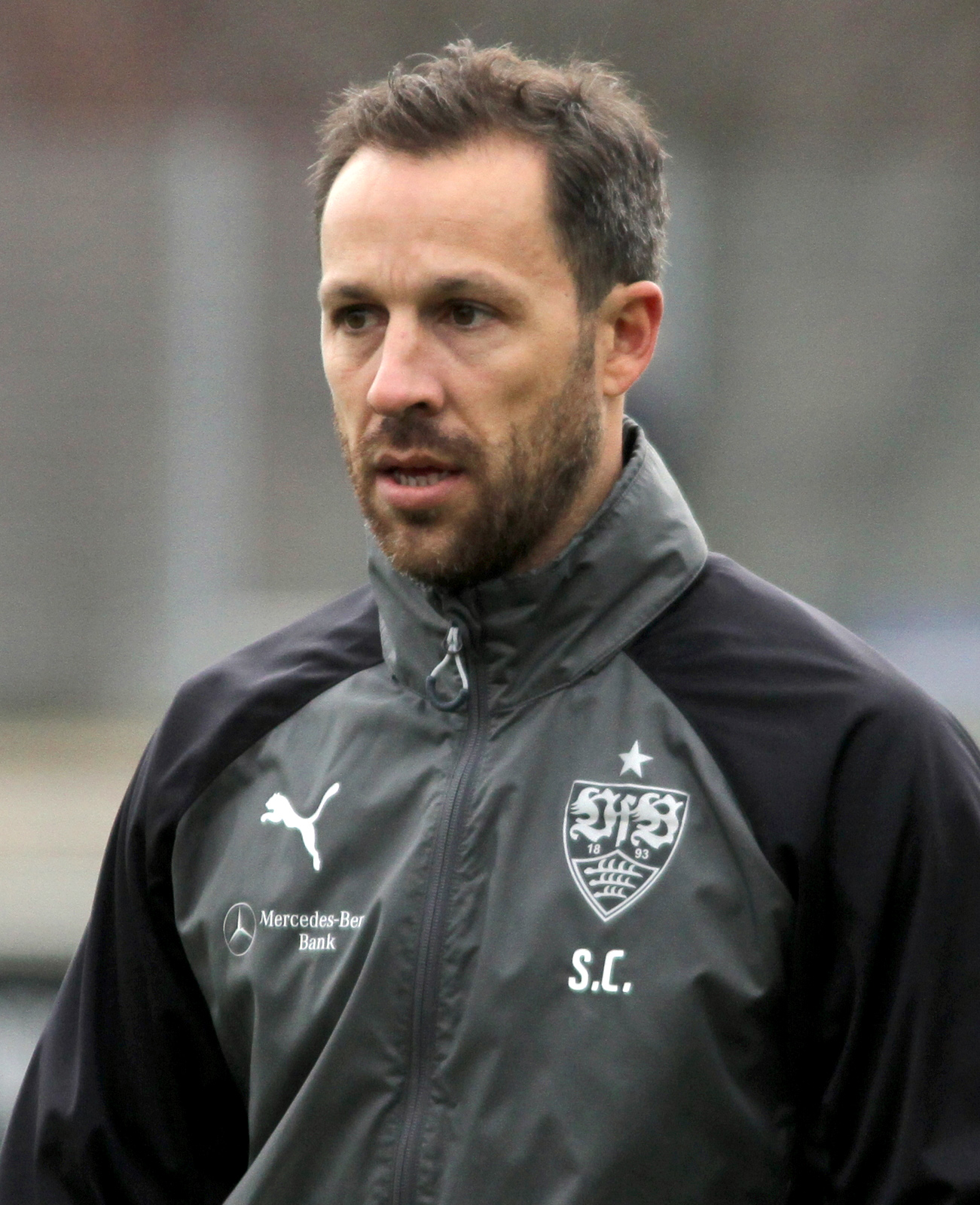
Steve Cherundolo, coach of LAFC from January 3, 2022 to December 1, 2025.

With the 2025, the club acquired Jeremy Ebobisse, Yaw Yeboah, Mark Delgado, and Nkosi Tafari. The club signed Igor Jesus and Artem Smolyakov while acquiring Odin Thiago Holm from Celtic and Cengiz Ünder from Fenerbahçe on loan. It was in response to the departures of Jesús Murillo, Ilie Sánchez, Mateusz Bogusz, Cristian Olivera, Kei Kamara, Eduard Atuesta, and Lewis O'Brien.

Los Angeles FC qualified for the 2025 CONCACAF Champions Cup defeating the Colorado Rapids in Round 1 and the Columbus Crew in the Round of 16. Los Angeles FC would then advance to the quarter-finals and face Inter Miami. In first leg, Los Angeles FC would win 1–0 but would lose to Inter Miami in the second leg 3–1 with an aggregate of 3–2 thus eliminating LAFC from the tournament. On April 18, 2025, Los Angeles FC announced that head coach Steve Cherundolo would step down after the 2025 season for personal reasons. Faced with being eliminated from the 2025 CONCACAF Champions Cup, having a 4–1–4 record and a low goal difference, LAFC acquired midfielder Frankie Amaya and Ryan Raposo.

On August 6, Los Angeles FC signed Korean star Son Heung-min from Tottenham Hotspur for a MLS transfer record of $26.5 million.

==== FIFA Club World Cup 2025 ====
On March 21, 2025, the FIFA Appeals Committee ruled that Club Leon which had won the 2023 CONCACAF Champions League, was removed from the FIFA Club World Cup 2025 due to having multi-club ownership criteria conflicts along with CF Pachuca winners of the 2024 CONCACAF Champions Cup. Both clubs are under the ownership of Grupo Pachuca. As a consequence, Club Leon's berth was vacant. Club Leon appealed to the Court of Arbitration for Sport but was unsuccessful. On May 16, 2025, FIFA announced a play-in game to determine the last berth to the FIFA Club World Cup 2025 between the 2023 CONCACAF Champions League runner-up LAFC and the top-ranked team of the 2024 Club World Cup Ranking by Confederation Club America to be played on May 31, 2025. LAFC would go on to win the match with 1-1 on regular time and 2-1 after extra time. LAFC thus was placed in Group D with Chelsea FC (England), Espérance Sportive de Tunis (Tunisia), and Flamengo (Brazil).

== Colors, badge, and sponsorship ==
The LA monogram that is used in LAFC black and gold caps.

The club's colors and logo were unveiled on January 7, 2016, at Union Station. The club's primary colors are black and gold, with red and gray used as accent colors. The Art Deco-inspired logo incorporates a shield outline referencing the city seal, with a winged "LA" monogram and the words "Los Angeles" and "Football Club" in Neutraface. The crest was developed and designed by Beacon Asia Consulting co-founder Thai Nguyen and the creative team of Tue Nguyen and Matthew Wolff.

=== Sponsorship ===
On January 31, 2018, LAFC announced that YouTube TV would be the club's first official shirt sponsor in addition to exclusively broadcasting the club's local matches in English. Target was announced as their first sleeve sponsor in October 2019.

On March 26, 2021, upon the expiration of its sponsorship contract with YouTube TV, LAFC announced that FLEX, a power tool manufacturer headquartered in Steinheim an der Murr, Germany, would replace YouTube TV as the main shirt sponsor for the club. Four days later, on March 30, 2021, the club announced that Postmates would become the second official sleeve sponsor (joining Target) on a one-year deal for the entirety of the 2021 season. Shortly thereafter, LAFC announced that YouTube TV no longer held exclusive broadcasting rights over English language home matches. Instead, the club chose to partner with two local networks for all English language home games beginning that season.

For the club's the 2022 season, LAFC announced on February 26, 2022, that it had partnered with PepsiCo to make Rockstar energy drink the exclusive shirt sponsor of its 2022 training kit. The agreement expired at the end of the season.

Prior to the 2023 season, on June 14, 2022, MLS announced a new media rights partnership with Apple giving the tech giant exclusive broadcast rights to all league games via its streaming service, Apple TV+, for the next 10 seasons. To promote this new partnership, as well as their new streaming service entitled MLS Season Pass, both MLS and Apple agreed to have the Apple TV+ logo appear on the left kit sleeve of all league teams beginning with the 2023 season. Additionally, Ford, LAFC's Official Domestic Automobile Partner, joined the club's top tier of sustained brand sponsorships - the "Golden Boot Club" - for the 2023 season. This enhanced partnership included Ford receiving promonent logo placement on the team's right kit sleeve.

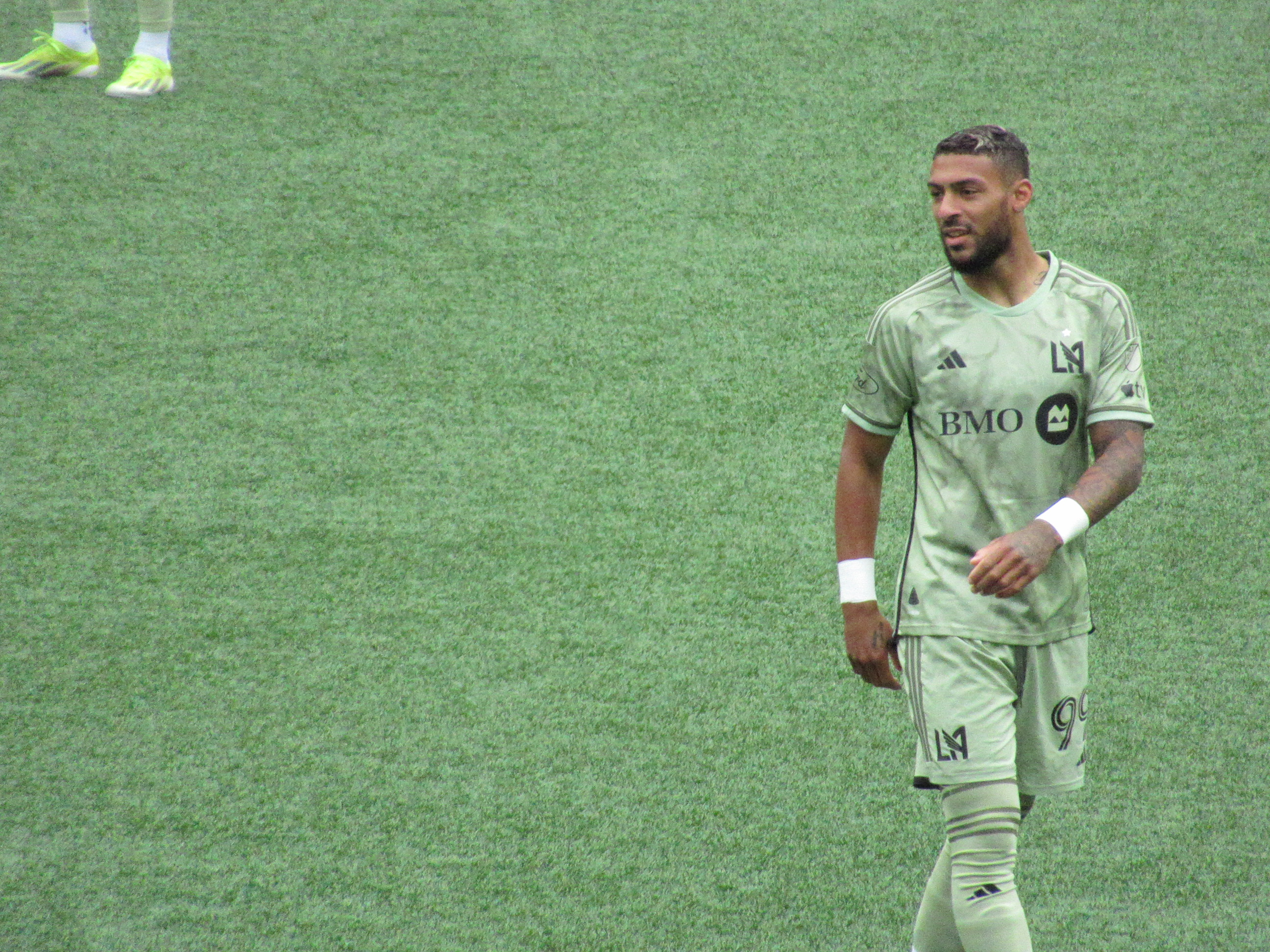
Denis Bouanga wearing the 2023 smokescreen kit with the new BMO Bank sponsor which replaced the FLEX sponsor in 2024.

Period	Kit manufacturer	Shirt sponsor	Sleeve sponsor
2018–2019	Adidas	YouTube TV	—
2020	Adidas	YouTube TV	Target
2021	Adidas	FLEX	Target Postmates
2022	Adidas	FLEX	Target
2023	Adidas	FLEX	Ford
2024–present	Adidas	BMO Bank	Ford

== Stadium ==
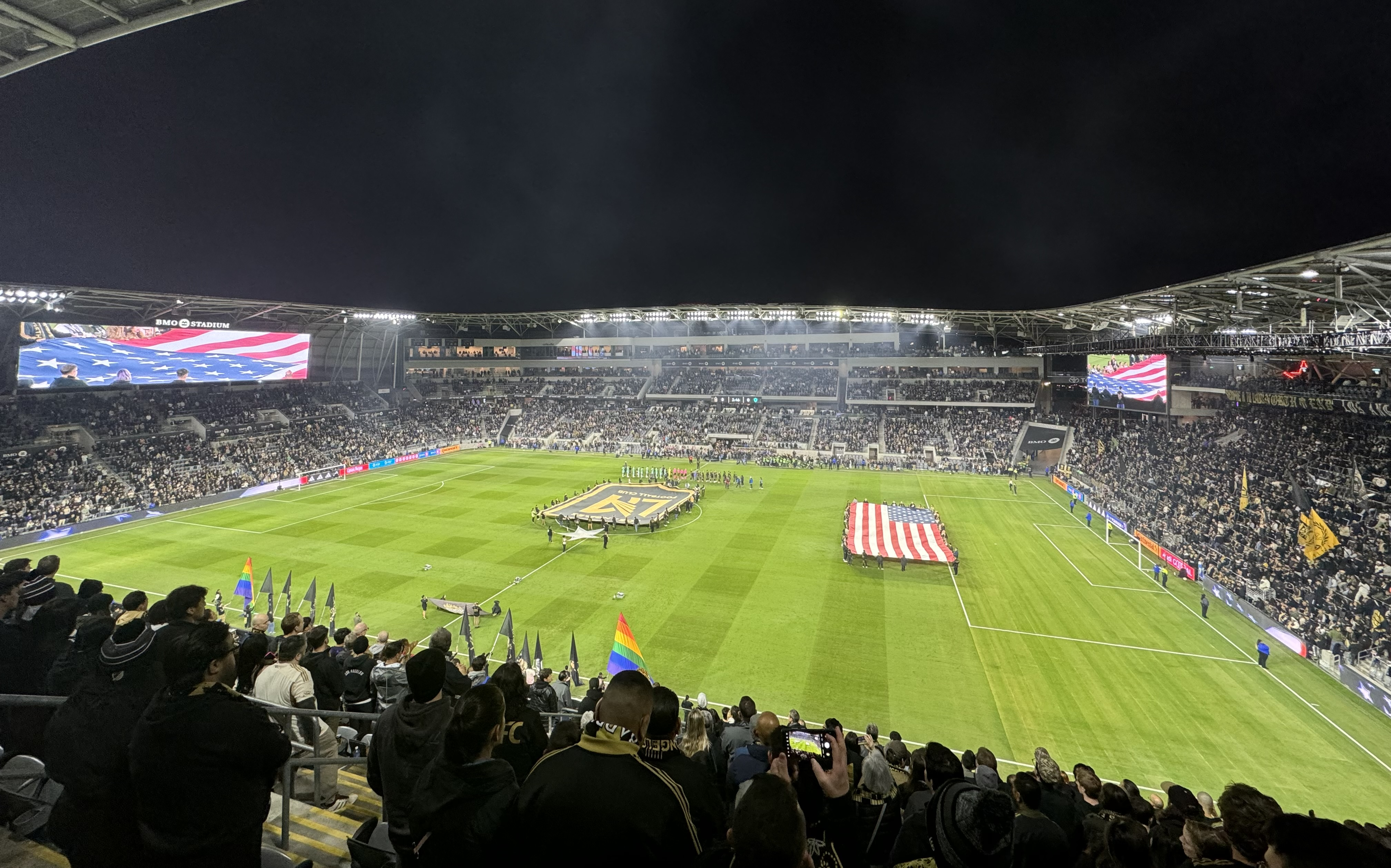
BMO Stadium in 2024

BMO Stadium has been the home of Los Angeles FC since 2018. It is shared with NWSL side Angel City FC, which is affiliated with LAFC and shares an ownership stake.

On May 17, 2015, the team chose the Los Angeles Memorial Sports Arena site to build a 22,000-seat soccer stadium in Exposition Park, estimated to cost $250 million. The site was under a sublease from the University of Southern California which managed and operated the Sports Arena and adjacent L.A. Memorial Coliseum. The environmental impact report, arena demolition, and stadium construction were expected to take three years and delay the team's debut to 2018. On May 6, 2016, the Los Angeles City Council approved the stadium, clearing a way for the construction of the stadium.

A groundbreaking ceremony took place on August 23, 2016. At the event attended by owners and construction crews, LAFC announced a 15-year, $100 million naming rights deal for the stadium with the Banc of California. Demolition of the Los Angeles Memorial Sports Arena began shortly after the groundbreaking and was completed by October 2016.

The first public event at the stadium was an open practice and dedication ceremony held on April 18, 2018. The club's first home match was played on April 29, 2018, against Seattle Sounders FC, with the home side winning 1–0. The lone goal was scored by Laurent Ciman in stoppage time in front of a capacity crowd of 22,000. The stadium was renamed to BMO Stadium on January 19, 2023.

Los Angeles FC's training facility is on the California State University, Los Angeles, campus as part of a partnership with the university that began in 2017. The LAFC Performance Center includes 4,000 square feet (370 m^{2}) of indoor space and a training field with the same grass as the team's home stadium.

== Club culture ==
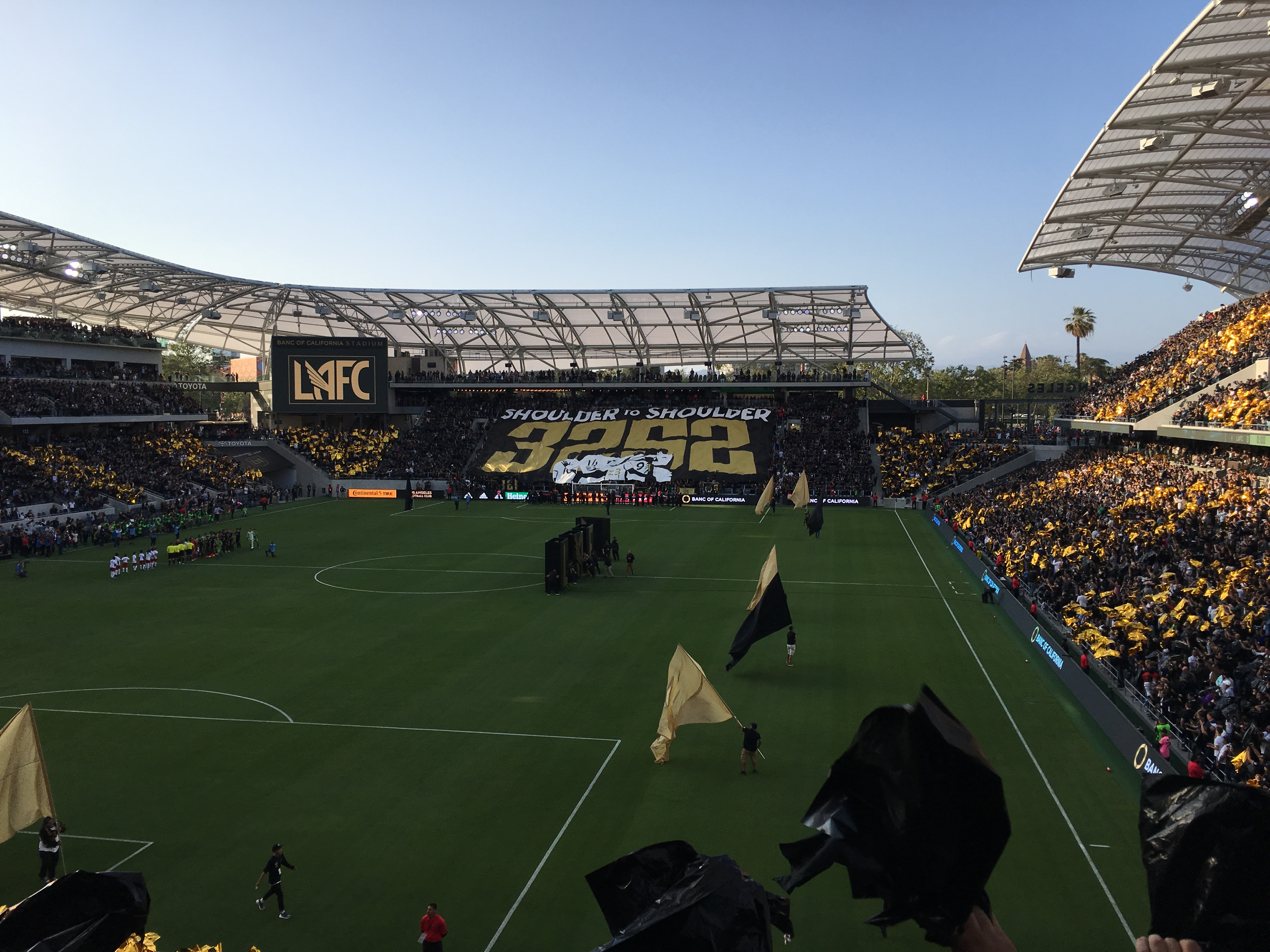
The 3252 Supporters unveiling their first tifo in the home inaugural game vs. the Seattle Sounders

After the launch, supporters were consulted on many of the club's early decisions including the team colors, the look of the crest and the design of BMO Stadium, built on land previously held by the LA Sports Arena. Much of the marketing focus was to millennials, which led to the decision to play near downtown Los Angeles. LAFC took a grassroots approach to building the club by founding the LAFC academy and signing younger prospects including Americans Walker Zimmerman and Tristan Blackmon, Portuguese draft pick João Moutinho, and Uruguayan prospect Diego Rossi.

=== Supporters ===
LAFC supporters are known collectively as "The 3252". The official capacity of the safe standing supporters section at BMO Stadium is 3,252. When added together, the numbers 3, 2, 5, 2 equal 12, serving as a reference to "the 12th man", and an homage to the supporters of the team. Composed of a variety of supporters groups, The 3252 is the club's independent supporters union, which encompasses a growing number of affiliate supporter groups such as the Black Army 1850, District Nine Ultras, Cuervos, Expo Originals, Tiger Supporter Group (TSG), The Krew, Luckys, Los Angelinos Originales, and Empire Boys. The 3252 also includes independent supporter groups with active season memberships such as LAFC Pride Republic, Lxs Tigres del North End, Offsiders, and 42Originals. The supporter section in the North End of the stadium is only for fans of LAFC. Anyone wearing other team gear is not allowed in the section. The 3252 has several chants that are sung throughout the match in English, Spanish and Korean including: Dale, Dale Black & Gold, This is Los Angeles, Venirte Ver, Aliento de Corazon, Forevermore, Jump for LA Football Club, Que Bonito Es, Dale Alegria a mi Corazon, and Uh Dirado.

=== Falcon program ===
The club's falcon program includes three live falcons who participate in various gameday and community events. One falcon is released pre-game by an honorary falconer (usually a celebrity or community figure) and flies around the stadium. The first honorary falconer was co-owner Will Ferrell. The three falcons are named after famous streets in Los Angeles: "Olly" (Olvera Street), "Fig" (Figueroa Street), and "Mel" (Melrose Avenue).

== Rivalries ==
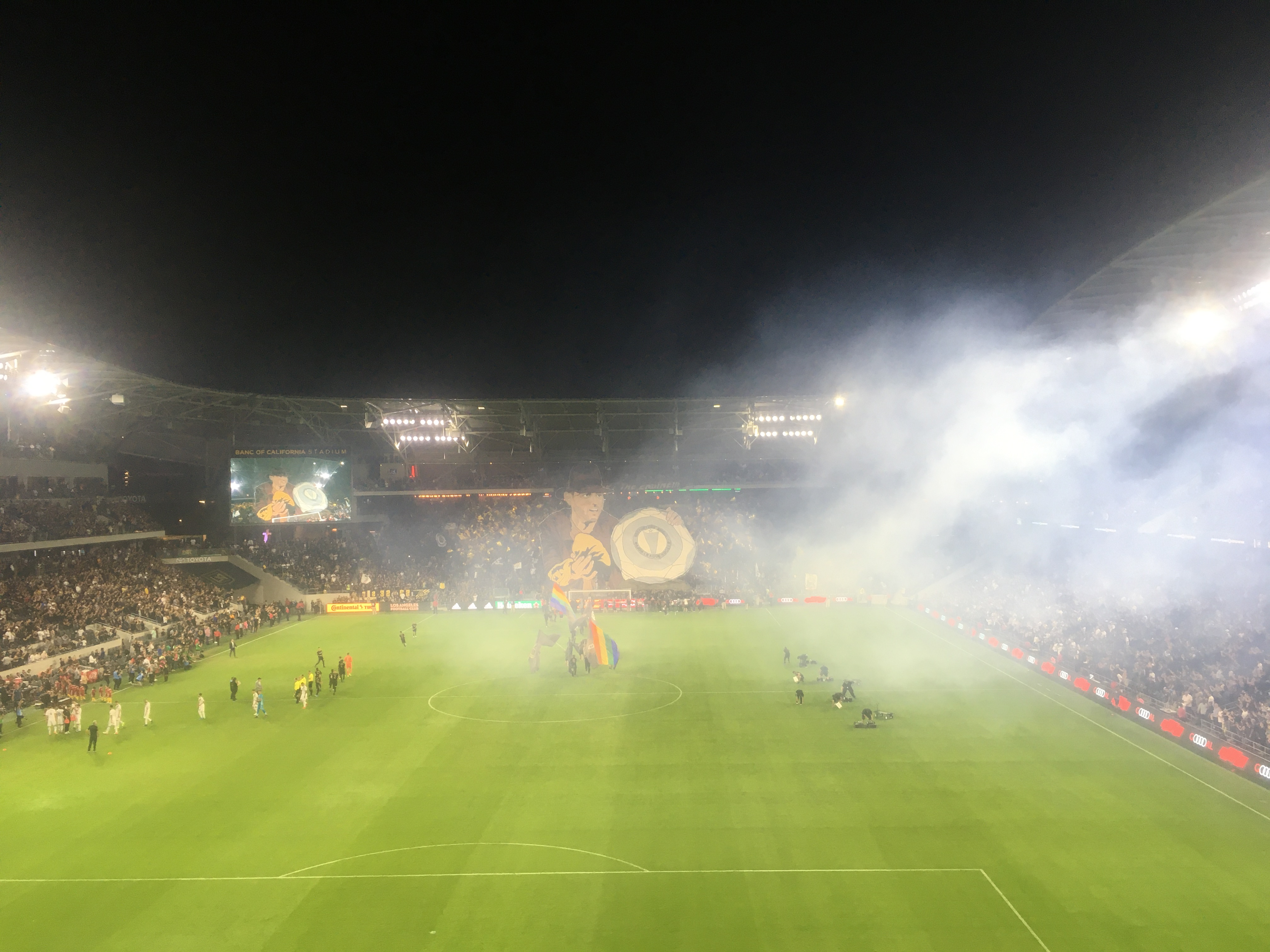
The 3252 Tifo for the 2019 Conference Final vs LA Galaxy. LAFC would go on to win for the first time 5-3 in the sixth edition of El Tráfico.

Since their establishment as an expansion team in 2014, Los Angeles FC have had a fierce rivalry with the LA Galaxy, from Carson, California, the closest MLS team. The rivalry between the two clubs has been dubbed El Tráfico by the supporters of both clubs, a humorous play on El Clásico. Since beginning in the league, LAFC have also had a on-field rivalry with the Seattle Sounders FC. Both teams have competed at the top of the Western Conference tables and the playoffs in the most recent seasons.

=== LA Galaxy ===
LAFC have a cross-town rivalry with fellow MLS club LA Galaxy, who play in the Los Angeles suburb of Carson. The series between the two teams is known as El Tráfico (Spanish for "The Traffic"), conversely, Spanish-language speakers and media commonly refer to it as the Clásico del Tráfico (English for the "Traffic Classic"). The nickname was coined by MLS fans and adopted by some media outlets following polls by SB Nation blogs LAG Confidential and Angels on Parade. It refers to the notorious traffic congestion in Los Angeles, among the worst in the United States and the world, while serving as a play on "El Clásico". The rivalry has also been called the "Los Angeles Derby", a moniker that was also used for the SuperClasico.

=== Seattle Sounders FC ===
LAFC's first game ever played was a 1–0 win at CenturyLink Field over Seattle Sounders FC on March 4, 2018, marking the earliest starting point of any of LAFC's on-field rivalries. LAFC's first home game at Banc of California Stadium was also a 1–0 win over Seattle, ending in dramatic fashion with a 92nd-minute goal by Laurent Ciman. The next season Seattle got its revenge, defeating LAFC for the first time in the 2019 Western Conference Finals, bringing L.A.'s record-setting season and first MLS Cup hopes to an end. In similar fashion LAFC in 2024 would prevent the Seattle Sounders from their 5th U.S. Open Cup by defeating them in the semifinals 1-0. Beyond these touchstone moments, the rivalry has been carried on by players, coaches and supporters.

== Broadcasting ==
From 2023, every LAFC match is available via MLS Season Pass on the Apple TV app, in addition to select matches simulcast linearly on Fox or FS1. Prior to this all-streaming deal, LAFC aired matches on a few stations and one other streaming platform.

In 2021 and 2022, all locally broadcast LAFC matches were televised in English by KCOP. Max Bretos served as the team's lead play-by-play announcer

YouTube TV carried live games for the team from 2018 to 2020. It marked the first time that a major U.S. professional sports team sold their regional broadcast rights to an online streaming service rather than a traditional television broadcaster or regional sports network.

Prior to Apple, locally broadcast LAFC matches were televised in Spanish on Estrella TV station KRCA, with Francisco X. Rivera as the lead play-by-play announcer. Regular local radio coverage of LAFC matches is provided in English by KSPN (ESPNLA 710), with Dave Denholm serving as the radio play-by-play announcer. Spanish radio broadcasts are provided by KFWB (980), with Armando Aguayo as the play-by-play announcer. The club also partners with KIRN (670) as part of the station's weekly sports report.

== Players and staff ==
=== Current roster ===
As of September 26, 2026

Note: Flags indicate national team as defined under FIFA eligibility rules; some limited exceptions apply. Players may hold more than one non-FIFA nationality.

No.	Pos.	Nation	Player
1	GK	FRA	Hugo Lloris
4	DF	COL	Eddie Segura
5	DF	SCO	Ryan Porteous
6	MF	BRA	Igor Jesus
7	FW	KOR	Son Heung-min (DP)
8	MF	USA	Mark Delgado
9	FW	GER	Armindo Sieb
11	MF	USA	Timothy Tillman
12	GK	CAN	Thomas Hasal
14	DF	ESP	Sergi Palencia
17	FW	USA	Jeremy Ebobisse
18	FW	CAN	Jacob Shaffelburg
19	FW	USA	Tyler Boyd
20	MF	ECU	Sergio Vásquez

No.	Pos.	Nation	Player
21	MF	CAN	Ryan Raposo
22	MF	USA	Jude Terry (HG)
23	DF	UKR	Yevhen Cheberko
24	DF	USA	Ryan Hollingshead
31	GK	USA	Cabral Carter (HG)
33	DF	USA	Aaron Long (captain)
43	FW	BRA	Thayllon (on loan from Avaí)
44	DF	USA	Christian Díaz (HG)
45	DF	USA	Kenny Nielsen
66	MF	CAN	Mathieu Choinière
81	MF	FIN	Leo Walta (on loan from Swansea City)
90	FW	CRO	Tommy Mihalić
91	DF	USA	Nkosi Tafari
99	FW	GAB	Denis Bouanga (DP)

=== Out on loan ===
Note: Flags indicate national team as defined under FIFA eligibility rules; some limited exceptions apply. Players may hold more than one non-FIFA nationality.

No.	Pos.	Nation	Player
29	DF	UKR	Artem Smolyakov (on loan to FC Kharkiv)
70	MF	GUA	Matt Evans (HG; on loan to Wacker Innsbruck)

No.	Pos.	Nation	Player
77	FW	IDN	Adrian Wibowo (HG; on loan to Wacker Innsbruck)

=== Coaching staff ===
As of January 11, 2026

Technical Staff
Head coach	Xavi Tamarit (interim)
Assistant coach	Andy Rose
Assistant coach	Enrique Duran
Goalkeeping coach	Oka Nikolov
Performance director	Gavin Benjafield
Technical director	Neil McGuinness
Assistant Technical director	Jordan Harvey
Head of strength and conditioning	Anton Matinlauri

=== Head coaches history ===
LAFC Head Coach History
Coach	Start	End
Bob Bradley	July 27, 2017	November 18, 2021
Steve Cherundolo	January 3, 2022	December 1, 2025
Marc Dos Santos	December 5, 2025	September 27, 2026
Xavi Tamarit (interim)	October 1, 2026	Present

== Team management ==
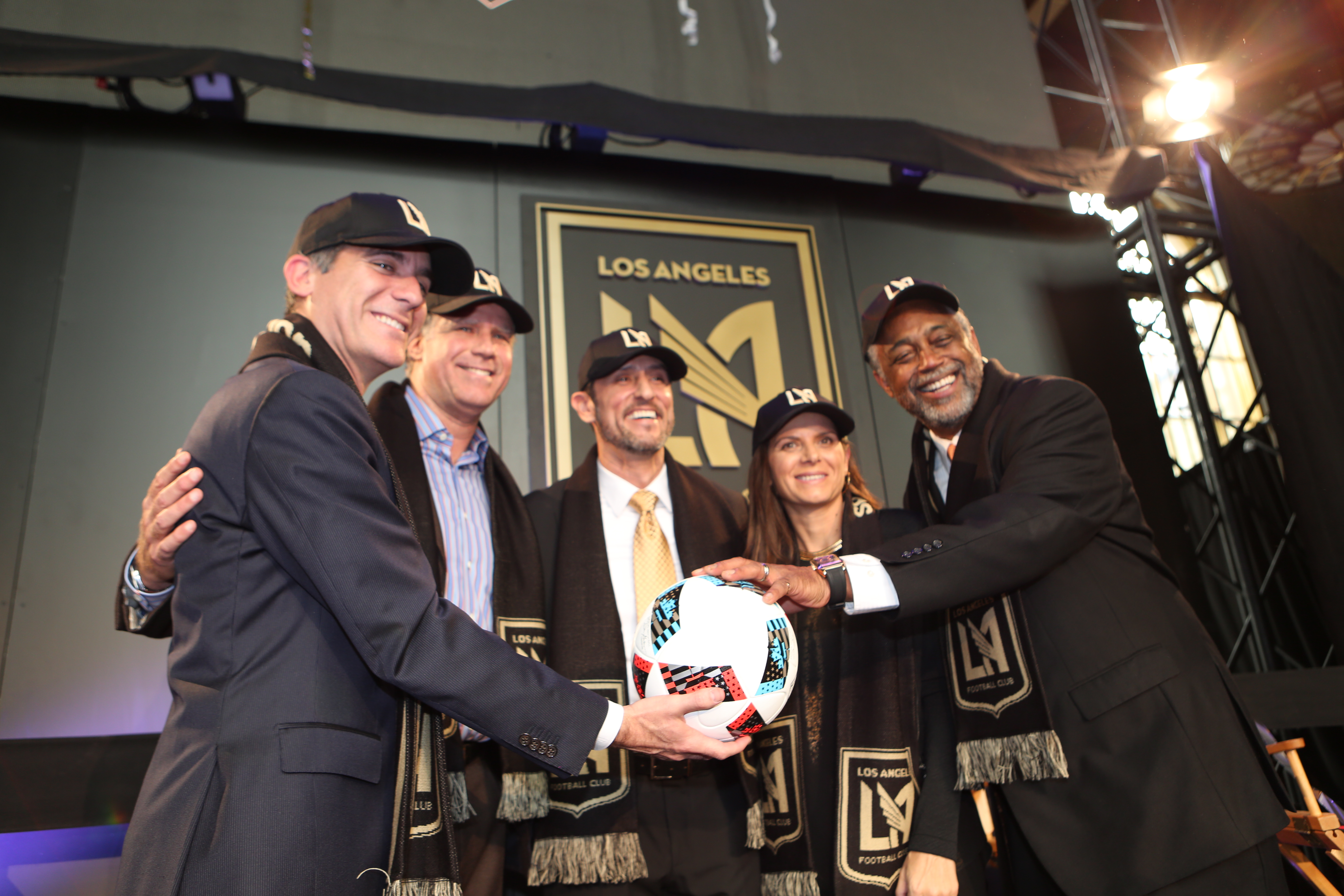
Ownership Group and Mayor Garcetti unveiling team colors.

In 2016, three local investors—Brandon Beck, Larry Berg and Bennett Rosenthal—took over as managing owners of the club with Berg serving as lead managing owner. As of 2017, chairman and CEO of Mandalay Entertainment Group and entrepreneur Peter Guber is executive chairman, and venture capitalist Henry Nguyen is vice-chairman. The ownership group in 2019 also included businessman Ruben Gnanalingam. Other part-owners and investors include Will Ferrell, Natalie Mariduena, Nomar Garciaparra, Mia Hamm-Garciaparra, Chad Hurley, Magic Johnson, Joseph Tsai, Giorgio Chiellini, Tucker Kain, Kirk Lacob, Mitch Lasky, Mark Leschly, Mike Mahan, Irwin Raij, Tony Robbins, Lon Rosen, Paul Schaeffer, Brandon Schneider, Allen Shapiro, Mark Shapiro, Jason Sugarman, Harry Tsao, and Rick Welts.

LAFC's first president was Tom Penn until he stepped down on August 18, 2020, to pursue a PPE business venture. Larry Freedman and John Thorrington took over as Co-presidents.

In February 2020, LAFC owners began the process of buying out a 20 percent ownership stake held by Malaysian businessman Vincent Tan. The buyout resulted in a total equity valuation of $700 million for the club, the largest on record for a Major League Soccer team at the time.

=== Front office ===
As of September 1, 2025

Front Office
Lead managing owner	Bennett Rosenthal
Co-managing owner	Brandon Beck
Co-managing owner	Larry Berg
Executive chairman and owner	Peter Guber
Director and owner	Henry Nguyen
Director and owner	Mitch Lasky
Director and owner	Goodwin Gaw
Director and owner	Adam Freede
Chief business officer	Stacy Johns
Co-president	Larry Freedman
Co-president and general manager	John Thorrington
Technical Director	Neil McGuinness
Director of Football operations	Vacant
Vice president of soccer operations	Mario Ancheta

== Development system ==
=== LAFC 2 ===
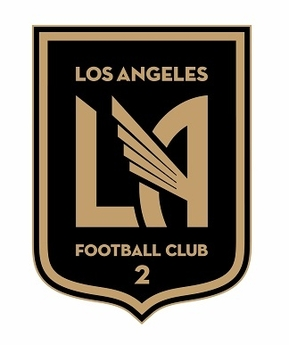
Los Angeles FC 2

On August 4, 2022, LAFC was named as one of 7 MLS-affiliated clubs that would field a team in the MLS Next Pro league beginning in the 2023 season. LAFC launched a reserve team, Los Angeles FC 2 (or LAFC2), for the 2023 season of MLS Next Pro. The team plays at Titan Stadium.

==== Coaching staff ====
Technical Staff
Head Coach	Vacant
Assistant Coach	Fabian Sandoval
Assistant Coach	Claine Plummer

==== Head coach history ====
Head coach history
Coach	Start	End
Enrique Duran	January 25, 2023	December 20, 2023
Junior Gonzalez	February 6, 2024	December 23, 2025

=== LAFC Academy ===
On February 1, 2016, the club announced the founding of the LAFC Academy. The academy is launching with a fully funded U12 USSDA academy team with a roster of 26 players. Todd Saldana served as academy director until January 16, 2025. On August 21, 2018, the U-13 squad won the CONCACAF Champions League, as champions of North America.

On July 8, 2020, LAFC signed its first three Homegrown players from the academy in Club history – Tony Leone, Christian Torres and Erik Dueñas.

On June 9, 2025, LAFC filled the Academy Director position by hiring Toni Hernandez. Toni Hernandez previous position was that of technical coordinator for FC Barcelona La Masia youth academy spending four years in that position.

==== Coaching staff ====
Technical Staff
Academy Director	Toni Hernandez
Academy Coach	Christopher Cuéllar
Academy Coach	Abraham Jacinto
Academy Coach	Marius Rus
Academy Staff Coach	Michael Jacobson
Academy Staff GK Coach	Adrian Padilla
Academy Scout	Gabriel Lucatero
Academy Scout	Mario Ayala
Academy Scout	Hector Garcia
Academy Scout	Joey Yusumas

=== Red & Gold Football ===
On March 13, 2023, Los Angeles FC & FC Bayern Munich announced a global soccer development cooperation. This would provide a platform for young talent featuring high level development a pathway to a first team. The two teams share a 50/50 ownership of the joint venture. The joint venture has already made partnerships with The Gambia soccer academy Gambinos Stars Africa (2023), Uruguayan Primera Division side Racing Club de Montevideo (2023), K League 1 side Jeju SK FC (2025), and Serie A de Ecuador side S.D. Aucas (2025).

=== Former Development ===
==== Orange County SC (2016–2018) ====
Orange County SC, competing in the USL Championship, was affiliated with Los Angeles FC as part of a multi-year affiliation agreement with the team that started on December 7, 2016, and ended after the 2018 season.

==== Las Vegas Lights FC (2021–2023) ====
LAFC announced their partnership with USL Championship club Las Vegas Lights FC. That partnership started on March 12, 2021, and ended in 2023 after the establishment of MLS Next Pro side Los Angeles FC 2.

== Partnerships ==
=== Grasshopper Club Zurich (2024–2026) ===
On January 17, 2024, it was announced that LAFC went into a long-term strategic partnership with Grasshopper Club Zurich of the Swiss Super League becoming the new majority shareholder in Grasshopper ltd. Grasshopper Fussball Stiftung will continue to hold a minority interest in the club. Following two years of controversial fan protests, LAFC announced the sale of their stake in the club to Bridge Football Group, on June 29th, 2026.

=== Angel City FC (2024–present) ===
On October 8, 2024, it was announced that LAFC took a minority stake in NWSL side Angel City FC which they share BMO Stadium with. The affiliation deal came from priced warrants issued to LAFC when Angel City FC signed a lease agreement to play at BMO Stadium.

== Honors ==
The MLS Supporters' Shield

In 2019, LAFC won their first major MLS trophy, the Supporters' Shield. They won it with a record breaking 72 points, in just their second season in existence. In 2022, LAFC won their second Supporters' Shield, becoming the second club to win two shields within their first five seasons (after D.C. United). LAFC capped-off the 2022 season by winning the MLS Cup over the Philadelphia Union. In 2024, LAFC won the U.S. Open Cup with a 3–1 victory against Sporting Kansas City. This marked the team’s very first Open Cup win.

Domestic
Competitions	Titles	Seasons
MLS Cup	1	2022
Supporters' Shield	2	2019, 2022
U.S. Open Cup	1	2024
Western Conference (Playoff)	2	2022, 2023
Western Conference (Regular Season)	3	2019, 2022, 2024

== Awards ==
=== Players ===
Honor	Player Name	Season
MLS Landon Donovan MVP Award	Carlos Vela	2019
CCL Golden Boot	Denis Bouanga	2023
MLS Golden Boot	Carlos Vela	2019
MLS Golden Boot	Diego Rossi	2020
MLS Golden Boot	Denis Bouanga	2023
MLS Goal of the Year Award	Son Heung-min	2025
MLS Comeback Player of the Year Award	Bradley Wright-Phillips	2020
CCL Best Young Player Award	Diego Palacios	2020
MLS Newcomer of the Year Award	Cristian Arango	2021
MLS Young Player of the Year Award	Diego Rossi	2020
MLS Cup MVP	John McCarthy	2022
CCL Golden Glove Award	John McCarthy	2023

=== Head coaches ===
Honor	Head coach	Season
Sigi Schmid Coach of the Year Award	Bob Bradley	2019

=== Staff ===
Honor	Head coach	Season
MLS Sporting Executive Of The Year Award	John Thorrington	2024

== Team records ==
=== List of seasons ===
This is a partial list of the last seasons completed by LAFC. For the full season-by-season history, see List of Los Angeles FC seasons.

Season	League									Position		Playoffs	USOC	Continental			Inter-Continental	Average attendance	Top goalscorer(s)	
Season	Pld	W	L	D	GF	GA	GD	Pts	PPG	Conf.	Overall	Playoffs	USOC	CCL	LC	CC	CWC	Average attendance	Name(s)	Goals
2018	34	16	9	9	68	52	+16	57	1.68	3rd	5th	R1	SF	-	-	-	DNQ	22,042	(Mexico) Carlos Vela	15
2019	34	21	4	9	85	37	+48	72	2.12	1st	1st	SF	QF	DNQ	DNE	DNQ	DNQ	22,251	(Mexico) Carlos Vela	38♦ (Note: Vela won the MLS Golden Boot (34 goals))
2020	22	9	8	5	47	39	+8	32	1.45	7th	12th	R1	NH	RU	NH	NH	DNQ	22,117	(Uruguay) Diego Rossi	18♦
2021	34	12	13	9	53	51	+2	45	1.32	9th	19th	DNQ	NH	DNQ	DNQ	DNQ	DNQ	20,204	(Colombia) Cristian Arango	14
2022	34	21	9	4	66	38	+28	67	1.97	1st	1st	W	R16	DNQ	EXH	DNQ	DNQ	22,090	(Colombia) Cristian Arango	21
2023	34	14	10	10	54	39	+15	52	1.53	3rd	8th	RU	R16	RU	QF	RU	DNQ	22,155	(Gabon) Denis Bouanga	37♦
2024	34	19	8	7	63	43	+20	64	1.88	1st	3rd	WCSF	W	DNQ	RU	DNQ	NH	22,122	(Gabon) Denis Bouanga	28
2025	34	17	8	9	65	40	+25	60	1.76	3rd	6th	WCSF	DNQ	QF	LP	DNQ	GS	21,931	(Gabon) Denis Bouanga	24
Total	260	129	69	62	501	339	+162	449	1.73	–	–	–	–	–	–	–	–	–	(Gabon) Denis Bouanga	101

1. Avg. attendance include statistics from league matches only.
2. Top goalscorer(s) includes all goals scored in League, MLS Cup Playoffs, U.S. Open Cup, MLS is Back Tournament, CONCACAF Champions League, FIFA Club World Cup, and other competitive continental matches.

== Player records ==
As of July 23, 2026

=== Matches ===
#	Name	Nation	MLS	Playoffs	USOC	CCC	Leagues Cup	MLS is Back	Campeones Cup	Club World Cup	Total
1	Eddie Segura	COL	155	8	9	15	8	5	0	4	204
2	Ryan Hollingshead	USA	137	15	6	19	13	0	1	4	195
3	Carlos Vela	MEX	152	13	8	13	2	0	1	0	189
4	Denis Bouanga	GAB	117	15	5	21	12	0	1	4	175
5	Latif Blessing	GHA	142	4	10	5	1	5	0	0	167

=== Goals ===
#	Name	Nation	MLS	Playoffs	USOC	CCC	Leagues Cup	MLS is Back	Campeones Cup	Club World Cup	Total
1	Denis Bouanga	GAB	73	10	1	15	13	0	0	2	114
2	Carlos Vela	MEX	78	2	3	8	2	0	0	0	93
3	Diego Rossi	URU	43	1	6	2	0	7	0	0	59
4	Cristian Arango	COL	30	2	3	0	0	0	0	0	35
5	Adama Diomande	NOR	20	2	2	0	0	0	0	0	24
5	Mateusz Bogusz	POL	18	1	1	0	4	0	0	0	24

=== Assists ===
#	Name	Nation	MLS	Playoffs	USOC	CCC	Leagues Cup	MLS is Back	Campeones Cup	Club World Cup	Total
1	Carlos Vela	MEX	42	7	2	2	1	0	0	0	54
2	Denis Bouanga	GAB	28	2	3	5	6	0	0	1	45
3	Eduard Atuesta	COL	22	0	2	1	1	1	0	0	27
4	Diego Rossi	URU	17	2	1	0	0	2	0	0	22
5	José Cifuentes	ECU	17	0	2	1	0	0	0	0	20

=== Clean sheets ===
#	Name	Nation	MLS	Playoffs	USOC	CCC	Leagues Cup	MLS is Back	Campeones Cup	Club World Cup	Total
1	Hugo Lloris	FRA	33	1	1	4	4	0	0	0	43
2	Tyler Miller	USA	19	0	1	0	0	0	0	0	20
3	Maxime Crépeau	CAN	11	4	1	0	0	0	1	0	17
4	John McCarthy	USA	8	0	0	4	2	0	1	0	15
5	Pablo Sisniega	MEX	3	0	1	0	0	0	0	0	4
5	Tomás Romero	SLV	4	0	0	0	0	0	0	0	4
