= Diego Rossi =

Uruguayan footballer (born 1998)

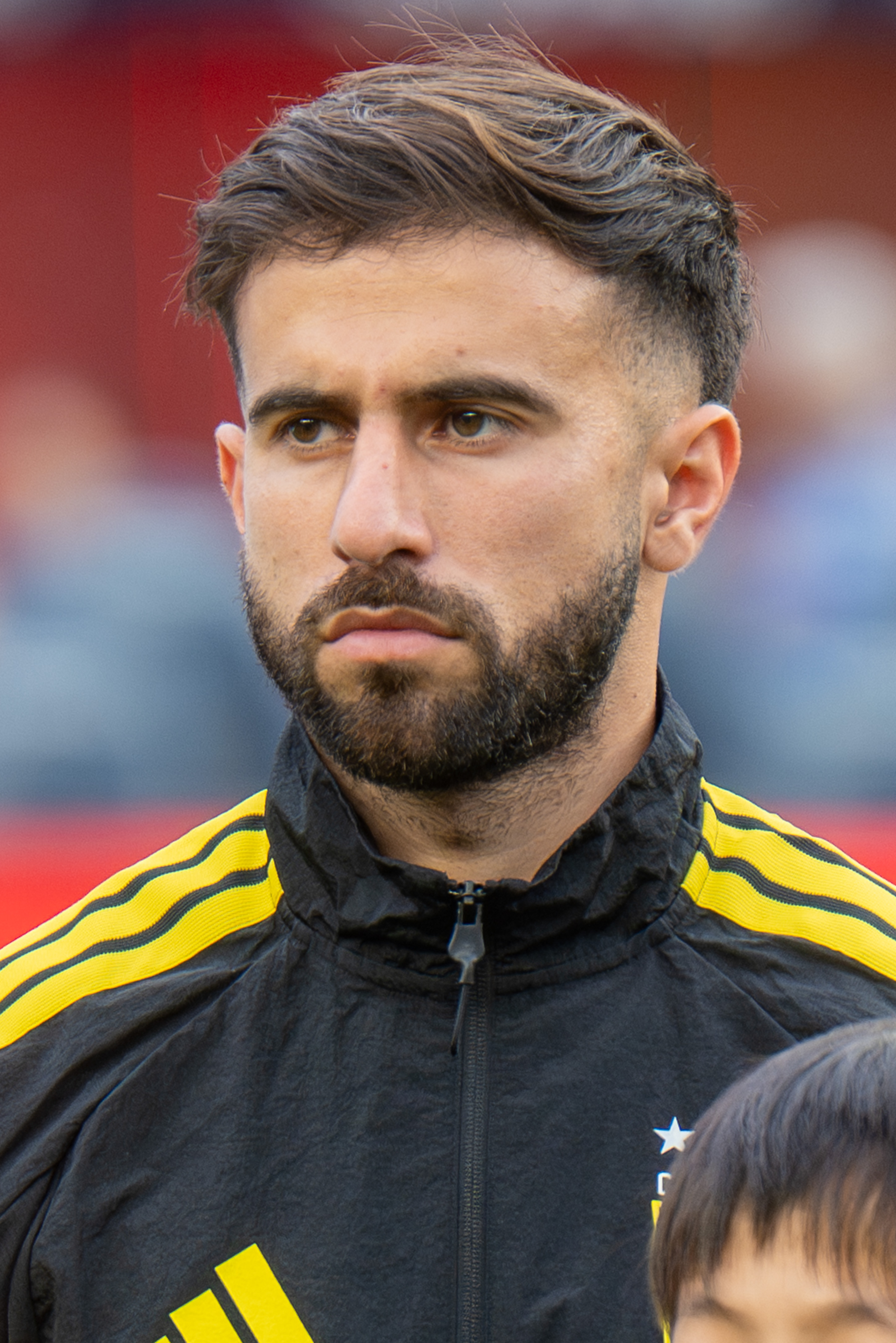
- Rossi with the Columbus Crew in 2026

Personal information
- Full name: Diego Martín Rossi Marachlián
- Date of birth: 5 March 1998 (age 28)
- Place of birth: Montevideo, Uruguay
- Height: 1.74 m (5 ft 9 in)
- Positions: Winger; forward

Team information
- Current team: Monterrey
- Number: 9

Youth career
- 2003–2008: Uruguay Solymar
- 2008–2016: Peñarol

Senior career*
| Years | Team | Apps | (Gls) |
| 2016–2017 | Peñarol | 46 | (13) |
| 2018–2022 | Los Angeles FC | 104 | (48) |
| 2021–2022 | → Fenerbahçe (loan) | 31 | (6) |
| 2022–2023 | Fenerbahçe | 33 | (4) |
| 2023–2026 | Columbus Crew | 88 | (37) |
| 2026– | Monterrey | 11 | (5) |

International career^{‡}
| 2013 | Uruguay U15 | 26 | (15) |
| 2014–2015 | Uruguay U17 | 23 | (8) |
| 2015 | Uruguay U18 | 6 | (0) |
| 2015–2017 | Uruguay U20 | 18 | (3) |
| 2020 | Uruguay U23 | 9 | (2) |
| 2022–2023 | Uruguay | 7 | (1) |
Medal record
Men's football
Representing Uruguay
South American U-20 Championship
| Winner | 2017 Ecuador |
- * Club domestic league appearances and goals as of 03:27, 22 October 2026 (UTC) ‡ National team caps and goals as of 20 June 2023

Diego Martín Rossi Marachlián (born 5 March 1998) is a Uruguayan professional footballer who plays as a winger or forward for Liga MX club Monterrey.

Developed in the youth academy of Peñarol, Rossi made his professional debut in 2016 and quickly emerged as one of the club's most promising attacking talents. In 2017, Rossi transferred to Los Angeles FC, becoming one of the expansion club's first marquee signings. He scored the first goal in the club's history and established himself as one of Major League Soccer's most prolific attackers. During the 2020 season, he won the MLS Golden Boot as the league's top scorer and was named to the MLS Best XI. Across four seasons with LAFC, he helped the club secure the Supporters' Shield and reach multiple domestic and continental finals. Rossi joined Turkish side Fenerbahçe in 2021, initially on loan before signing permanently, and won the 2022–23 Turkish Cup during his time there. He returned to MLS in 2023 with the Columbus Crew, playing a key role in the club's MLS Cup triumph in 2023, and a Leagues Cup win in 2024. In 2026, Rossi joined Mexican side Monterrey.

== Club career ==
=== Youth ===
Rossi began playing football as a child at the El Queso school in Solymar. At the age of six, Rossi moved to the Solymar Uruguay Sports Center, with which he competed in the Interbalnearian League of Youth Football. He demonstrated his ability in the club and caught the attention of Peñarol, where he joined their academy at the age of 12. Néstor Gonçalves discovered him and was invited to play a friendly tournament in Alegrete with the a team, where he eventually was offered a contract.

At the age of 14, Rossi was the top scorer for the team's under-14 team in the Uruguayan seventh tier, where he was a top scorer in 2012 with 42 goals in 27 matches. The following year, Rossi joined the Peñarol youth team in the Uruguayan sixth division, where he scored 25 times in 17 appearances. With Penarol's U-15 team, Rossi helped the team win the Apertura Tournament and the Uruguayan U-15 Championship as well as the Fabian Lomineto Cup.

In 2014, he was the top scorer of the Uruguayan Premier Division Under-16 Tournament, scoring 17 goals in the first half of the year, where Peñarol came out champions of the U-16 Clausura Tournament.

On 7 April 2015, he was invited to train with the first-team squad of Peñarol for the first time, along with his teammates from the under-17 team Santiago Bueno and Federico Valverde.

He was promoted by Pablo Bengoechea to the first team for the 2015–16 season in August. Rossi alternated the practices with their U-18 team and Peñarol's senior team, but he played with the U-17 club and in the Third or Fourth Division for the entirety of the season.

He finished 2015 helping the Peñarol's U-17 team win the Apertura U-17 Tournament, and after beating Danubio in a final in which he scored a goal. For the fourth consecutive year he was the top scorer of the championship, with 22 goals plus one in the final, although he played ten games in the Fourth and Third Division.

=== Peñarol ===
On 5 January 2016, Rossi began the preseason with the Peñarol first team. He debuted with the club on 16 January 2016, in the Bandes Cup final, where he came on in the 7th minute for Gabriel Leyes in a 1–0 victory against Cerro Porteño. Rossi made his debut with the club at the age of 17 years and 317 days old. At the end of the 2015–16 season, Rossi was demoted to the second team following a change in managerial leadership, where Bengoechea was sacked and Jorge Orosmán da Silva took over.

Following a series of poor results, da Silva called Rossi into the first team, where on 20 April 2016, he made his full debut with the club, playing against Sporting Cristal in the 2016 Copa Libertadores group stage match. Five days later, he scored his first professional goal against Rentistas after coming on as a second-half substitute for Diego Forlán. Deployed as a striker at various youth levels, Rossi eventually shifted out as a winger when manager Leonardo Ramos believed his skillset would offer more in a wider position without having to sacrifice any of Peñarol’s other forwards in the starting lineup.

=== Los Angeles FC ===
On 14 December 2017, Rossi was transferred to Los Angeles FC of Major League Soccer, an expansion franchise that began play in 2018. On 4 March 2018, Rossi made his MLS debut in Seattle against Seattle Sounders FC. Rossi's goal in the 11th minute was the first goal in Los Angeles FC history. The goal was also the fastest goal by an expansion team in MLS history. The following match, Rossi scored a brace and added an assist in the 5–1 trouncing of Real Salt Lake. On 8 August 2018, Rossi scored all three goals for his club and recorded his first hat-trick in MLS during a U.S. Open Cup semifinal match against the Houston Dynamo, a game in which LAFC ultimately lost in penalty kicks.

During the 2019 season, Rossi scored in the opening match of the season, a 2–1 victory for LAFC. He scored in three consecutive matches twice, notably netting a hat-trick in a 4–0 win over D.C. United on 6 April. At the conclusion of the regular season, LAFC won their first ever Supporters' Shield for having the best record during the regular season.

On 18 July 2020, Rossi became the 13th MLS player and first LAFC player to score four goals in a match, doing so in a 6–2 victory over rivals LA Galaxy in the MLS is Back Tournament group stage. During the playoffs, Rossi missed the round of 16 loss to Seattle Sounders FC after testing positive for COVID-19 while on international duty. He finished the pandemic-shortened 2020 season with 14 goals, which won him the MLS Golden Boot, as well as a spot on both the MLS Best XI, and the CONCACAF Champions League Best XI.

After missing the first two games of the 2021 season due to injury, Rossi made his season debut week three in Houston. He scored his first goal of the season in the following game, a 2–1 loss against the LA Galaxy. On 22 May, he scored a brace against the Colorado Rapids.

=== Fenerbahçe ===
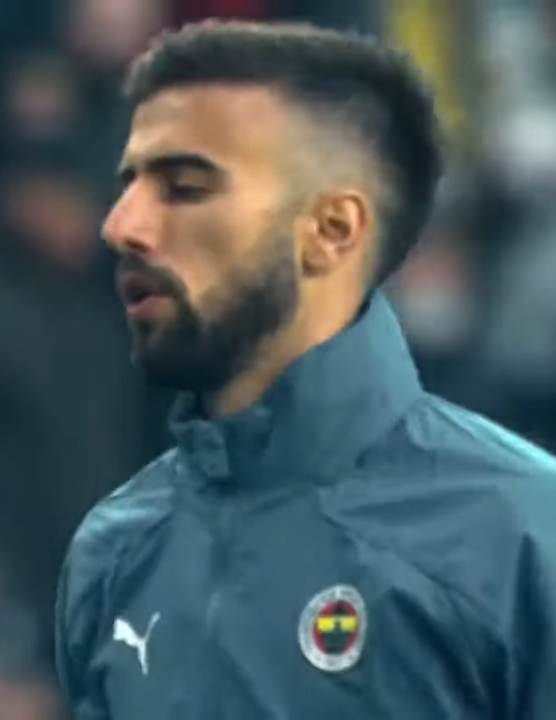
Rossi with Fenerbahçe in 2021

On 1 September 2021, it was announced that Rossi would join Süper Lig club Fenerbahçe on loan with an option to buy, making him the second Armenian-heritage footballer to play in the Turkish league after Aras Özbiliz. He made his debut for Fenerbahçe in Week 4 of the league against Sivasspor, playing the full 90 minutes. He made his Europa League debut four days later in a group stage game against Eintracht Frankfurt His first assist came in Week 6 against Giresunspor, setting up Ferdi Kadıoğlu’s goal in a match Fenerbahçe won 2–1. Rossi scored his first goal for the club in Week 7 with a volley against Hatayspor, contributing to another 2–1 victory. The following week, Rossi provided both assists in his team's 2–1 victory. He was substituted in the 67th minute and received a standing ovation from Fenerbahçe fans. He scored in the 3rd minute against Trabzonspor the next game, marking his team's only goal in a match that ended in a 3–1 loss after Fenerbahçe went down to 10 men. On 15 April 2022, Fenerbahçe announced that they acquired Rossi on a permanent transfer for a reported $6 million (€5.5 million). He signed a three-year contract, beginning with the 2022–23 season. He scored goals in back-to-back games, first against Rizespor on 22 April, followed by a game at home against Gaziantep FK.

During the 2022–23 season, He scored four goals across 33 league appearances. Notably, he assisted two goals in his side's 4–0 win over Hatayspor. Rossi helped Fenerbahçe qualify for the group stage of the Europa League, where they finished first in their group. Fenerbahçe would be eliminated in the next round by Spanish team Sevilla 2–1 on aggregate. He was part of the team that won the Turkish Cup, giving him his first and only trophy with the "Yellow Canaries".

=== Columbus Crew ===
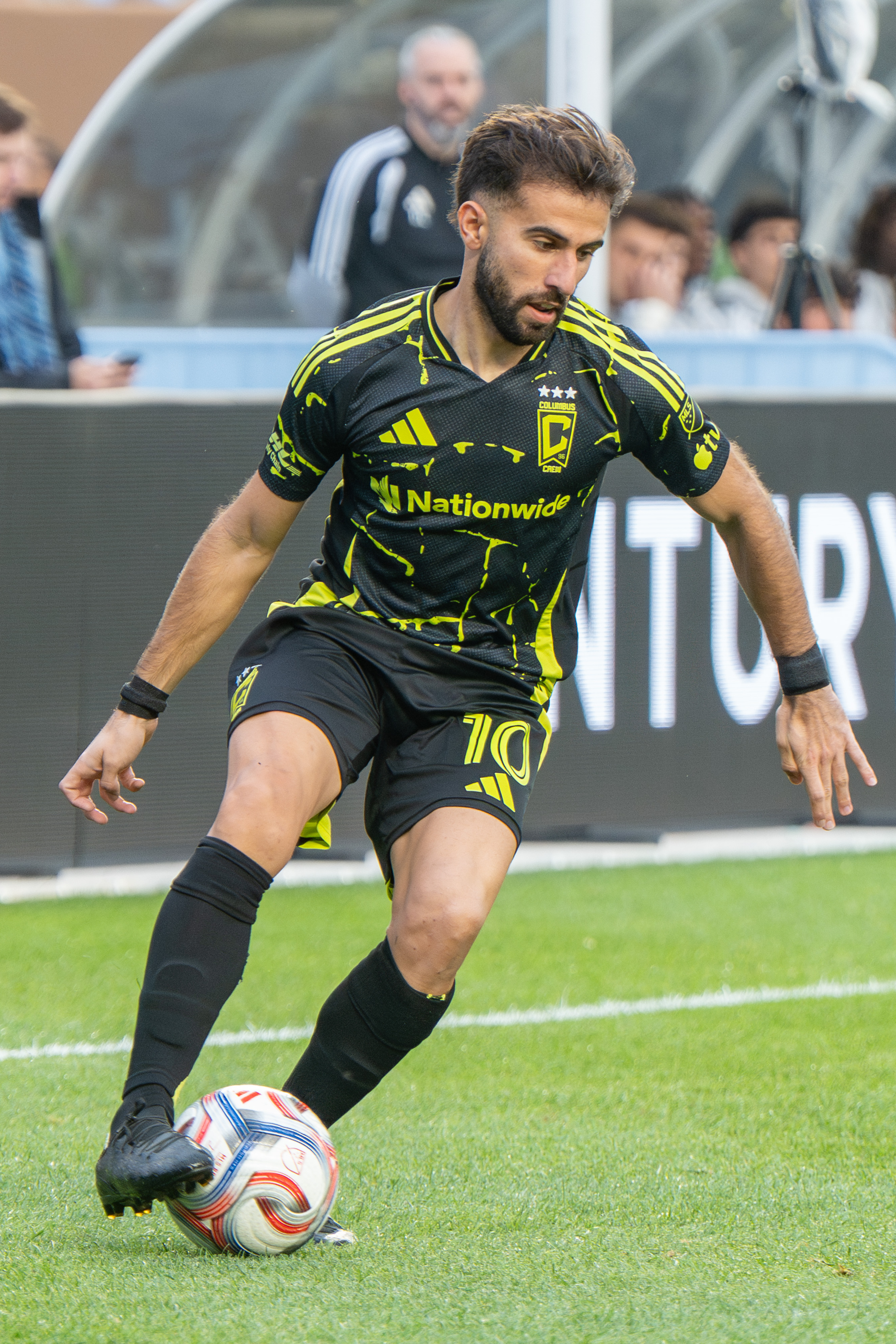
Diego Rossi with the Columbus Crew in 2026

==== 2023 ====
On 2 August 2023, Rossi joined Columbus Crew on a three-year contract, returning to MLS after two years in Turkey. The agreement included a base transfer fee of $5.63 million with a $1 million bonus fee and a 15% sell-on clause. Rossi made his debut for the Crew on 20 August against FC Cincinnati. He scored the first goal with his new club in the next match, a 2–0 win against Toronto FC. On 4 October, he scored and assisted in the 2–1 win away from home versus the New England Revolution. During the MLS Cup playoffs, he had an assist in three straight games, the final of which included a goal of his own. He scored the tying goal in the eventual Eastern Conference Finals win versus FC Cincinnati. Rossi ended his truncated 2023 season with 16 appearances, five goals, five assists, and an MLS Cup.

==== 2024 ====
At the start of the 2024 season, Rossi struggled to find his scoring touch, failing to score a goal in eight games before scoring in the quarterfinals of the CONCACAF Champions Cup against Tigres UANL. He netted a goal in each leg of the series, accounting for his club's only two goals as his team advanced via penalty shootout. In the semifinals against Monterrey, Rossi delivered the match-winning goal in the second leg, securing the Crew's spot in the final. For his performance in the competition, Rossi was named in the Champions Cup Best XI. Rossi carried his strong cup form into league play, scoring in three consecutive matches, including a brace against Orlando City. After a brief scoring drought of four games, he rebounded with a streak of four consecutive matches where he scored one goal in each, all resulting in victories for Columbus. On July 20, he scored his team's only goal in a 2–1 defeat against Atlanta United. The league season was put on pause as the team participated in Leagues Cup, Where Rossi scored a brace in back-to-back games against Sporting KC and Inter Miami, respectively. He scored a brace in the semifinal match win versus Philadelphia Union, en route to winning the Leagues Cup. After the resumption of league play, Rossi scored three more times in the regular season, ending his 2024 season with 21 goals in 48 games throughout all competitions.

==== 2025 ====
On the first game of the 2025 season, Rossi scored a brace in a 4–2 win at home against Chicago Fire FC. He scored a penalty in the CONCACAF Champions Cup round of 16 match versus Los Angeles FC. He scored both goals in a come-from-behind 2–1 win at D.C. United, and netted the match winner two weeks later in a 2–1 victory, defeating St. Louis City SC on the road at Energizer Park. On 13 September, he scored a hat-trick in 39 minutes in a game at Atlanta United, before coming off with an injured hamstring just three minutes later. After missing the next three games due to the hamstring injury, Rossi made his return to action on 4 October, starting the away match against Orlando City. Rossi ended the season as the top scorer for the Columbus Crew across all competitions with 19 goals.

=== Monterrey ===
On July 3, 2026, Monterrey reached an agreement to sign Rossi for an undisclosed fee.

== International career ==
=== Youth ===
Rossi began his international career for Uruguay with under-15 team and went on to earn caps for Uruguay's different age level national teams. He was part of Uruguay squad at 2013 South American U-15 Championship, 2015 South American U-17 Championship, 2017 South American U-20 Championship, and 2020 CONMEBOL Pre-Olympic Tournament. In total, he scored 28 goals in 82 matches for Uruguay's youth national teams.

=== Senior ===
On 18 September 2020, Rossi was included in Uruguay's 26-man preliminary squad for World Cup qualifying matches against Chile and Ecuador. On 5 October 2020, Rossi was included in the final squad as a replacement for injured Cristhian Stuani.

== Style of play ==
"One of the first qualities I developed was the ability to stay calm no matter what. I still have this. If I score a hat trick, I don’t get carried away. If I miss nine chances in a match, I don’t get too low. I keep my emotions stable. I think that has enabled me to score goals on a more consistent basis, and that is important because consistency wins you titles."

— Diego Rossi

Comfortable attacking on either wing or as a centre-forward, Rossi's playing style is marked by his pace, work rate, calmness on the ball, and off-ball movement. While he often drifts from wide positions into half-spaces, he also regularly drops deeper to get on the ball. From there, he can use his speed and agility to take on defenders, while also having the technical ability and vision to provide precise passes to his teammates.

== Personal life ==
Rossi is of Italian descent through his paternal side and Armenian descent through his maternal side. He had received invitations to play for the Armenia national team, which he refused given his desire to represent Uruguay. His younger brother Nicolás is also a professional footballer and has pledged to play for the Armenia national team.

Rossi states his idol as Luis Suárez.

== Career statistics ==
=== Club ===
As of match played on 6 September 2026

Appearances and goals by club, season and competition
| Club | Season | League | | | National cup (Note: Includes U.S. Open Cup, Turkish Cup) | | Continental | | Other | | Total | |
| Club | Season | Division | Apps | Goals | Apps | Goals | Apps | Goals | Apps | Goals | Apps | Goals |
|---|---|---|---|---|---|---|---|---|---|---|---|---|
| Peñarol | 2015–16 | Uruguayan Primera División | 6 | 1 | — | | 2 (Note: One appearance in Copa Libertadores, one appearance in Copa Sudamericana) | 0 | 1 (Note: Appearance(s) in Uruguayan Primera División play-offs) | 1 | 9 | 2 |
| Peñarol | 2016 | Uruguayan Primera División | 6 | 1 | — | | — | | — | | 6 | 1 |
| Peñarol | 2017 | Uruguayan Primera División | 31 | 10 | — | | 3 (Note: Appearances in Copa Libertadores) | 0 | 2 | 0 | 36 | 10 |
| Peñarol | Total | | 43 | 12 | — | | 5 | 0 | 3 | 1 | 51 | 13 |
| Los Angeles FC | 2018 | MLS | 32 | 12 | 4 | 5 | — | | 1 (Note: Appearance(s) in MLS Cup playoffs) | 0 | 37 | 17 |
| Los Angeles FC | 2019 | MLS | 34 | 16 | 3 | 1 | — | | 2 | 1 | 39 | 18 |
| Los Angeles FC | 2020 | MLS | 19 (Note: Includes three appearances and five goals in MLS is Back Tournament group stage) | 14 | — | | 5 (Note: Appearances in CONCACAF Champions League/Cup) | 2 | 2 (Note: Appearances in MLS is Back Tournament knockout stage) | 2 | 26 | 18 |
| Los Angeles FC | 2021 | MLS | 19 | 6 | 0 | 0 | — | | 0 | 0 | 19 | 6 |
| Los Angeles FC | Total | | 104 | 48 | 7 | 6 | 5 | 2 | 5 | 3 | 121 | 59 |
| Fenerbahçe (loan) | 2021–22 | Süper Lig | 31 | 6 | 2 | 0 | 6 (Note: Appearances in UEFA Europa League) | 0 | — | | 39 | 6 |
| Fenerbahçe | 2022–23 | Süper Lig | 33 | 4 | 6 | 0 | 12 (Note: Ten appearances in UEFA Europa League, two appearances in UEFA Champions League) | 0 | — | | 51 | 4 |
| Fenerbahçe | Fenerbahçe total | | 64 | 10 | 8 | 0 | 18 | 0 | — | | 90 | 10 |
| Columbus Crew | 2023 | MLS | 10 | 3 | 0 | 0 | — | | 6 | 2 | 16 | 5 |
| Columbus Crew | 2024 | MLS | 34 | 12 | — | | 7 | 3 | 7 (Note: Five appearances and six goals in Leagues Cup, one appearance in Campeones Cup, one appearance in MLS Cup playoffs) | 6 | 48 | 21 |
| Columbus Crew | 2025 | MLS | 29 | 16 | — | | 2 | 1 | 6 (Note: Three appearances and two goals in Leagues Cup, three appearances in MLS Cup playoffs) | 2 | 37 | 19 |
| Columbus Crew | 2026 | MLS | 15 | 6 | 1 | 0 | — | | — | | 16 | 6 |
| Columbus Crew | Total | | 88 | 37 | 1 | 0 | 9 | 4 | 19 | 10 | 117 | 51 |
| Monterrey | 2026–27 | Liga MX | 6 | 2 | — | | 0 | 0 | 6 (Note: Appearances in Leagues Cup) | 2 | 12 | 4 |
| Career total | | | 306 | 109 | 16 | 6 | 37 | 6 | 33 | 16 | 392 | 137 |

=== International ===
As of match played on 20 June 2023

Appearances and goals by national team and year
| National team | Year | Apps | Goals |
|---|---|---|---|
| Uruguay | 2022 | 4 | 1 |
| Uruguay | 2023 | 3 | 0 |
| Total | | 7 | 1 |

Scores and results list Uruguay's goal tally first, score column indicates score after each Rossi goal.

List of international goals scored by Diego Rossi
| No. | Date | Venue | Opponent | Score | Result | Competition |
|---|---|---|---|---|---|---|
| 1 | 11 June 2022 | Estadio Centenario, Montevideo, Uruguay | Panama | 5–0 | 5–0 | Friendly |

== Honours ==
Peñarol

- Uruguayan Primera División: 2015–16, 2017

Los Angeles FC

- Supporters' Shield: 2019

Fenerbahçe

- Turkish Cup: 2022–23

Columbus Crew

- MLS Cup: 2023
- Leagues Cup: 2024

Uruguay Youth

- South American Youth Football Championship: 2017

Individual

- MLS All-Star: 2019, 2021, 2024, 2025
- MLS is Back Tournament Golden Boot: 2020
- MLS is Back Tournament Young Player of the Tournament: 2020
- MLS is Back Tournament Best XI: 2020
- MLS Golden Boot: 2020
- MLS Young Player of the Year: 2020
- MLS Best XI: 2020
- CONCACAF Champions League Team of the Tournament: 2020, 2024
- Best MLS Player ESPY Award: 2021
