= Tom Penn =

American sports executive

- Born: Peoria, Illinois, U.S.
- Education: University of Illinois (JD) University of Notre Dame (BA, Economics)
- Occupations: Professional Sports Executive, Sports & Business of Sports Media Analyst, Investor, Advisor, Lawyer

Tom Penn is an American sports executive who is the chief executive officer of Major League Soccer club San Diego FC. Penn previously co-founded Major League Soccer expansion team Los Angeles FC in 2014, and served as president and co-owner before stepping down from the position in 2020. He is a former National Basketball Association (NBA) executive with the Vancouver Grizzlies, Memphis Grizzlies, and the Portland Trail Blazers. He is a co-founder of the Sports Leadership Institute and NBA analyst for ESPN and Turner Network Television, TNT (American TV network).

== San Diego Football Club (Major League Soccer (MLS) ==
Tom Penn is a co-founder and Chief Executive Officer of San Diego FC, and of Right to Dream San Diego, a residential soccer academy and educational institution affiliated with the club. Major League Soccer announced San Diego FC as its 30th expansion club in May 2023. Penn was involved in the early formation of the ownership group, led by Sir Mohamed Mansour and the Sycuan Band of the Kumeyaay Nation, and in shaping the club’s long-term strategy centered on player development, community engagement, and global pathways for young athletes. With only 20 months to build the organization, brand, football team, and supporter community, the team kicked off play in February 2025. In addition to overseeing the buildout of football and business operations, the MLS project included the establishment of a residential academy designed to identify and develop young talent from across North America while providing academic education alongside elite soccer training. San Diego FC and the Right to Dream academy represent one of the first integrated MLS club-and-academy models built in partnership with the international Right to Dream network with Academies in Ghana, Egypt, and sister club FC Norjjland. Located on Sycuan tribal land in El Cajon, the Academy is an integral part of the San Diego FC’s 125,000 square-foot campus and includes a 50,000-square-foot state-of-the-art sports performance facility shared with San Diego FC’s first team and academy teams. The facility features a residential school, dormitory, and five full-sized football fields, including three natural turf fields and two synthetic turf fields, creating a world-class training environment for young athletes. According to Penn, “The San Diego FC Performance Center and Right to Dream Academy will enable us to develop future generations of world-class players across greater San Diego. This initiative reaffirms our commitment to create opportunities for young talent to flourish and our vision to become the epicenter of football excellence and innovation in North America.” In December of 2025 Right to Dream was honored with the Globe Soccer Award for Best Academy.

Under Penn's leadership as CEO, San Diego FC’s first MLS season in 2025 included record-setting regular season success for an expansion team, including 19 wins and 63 points and the No. 1 seed in the Western Conference. The team lost in the Western Conference Finals to the Vancouver Whitecaps, one win short of the 2025 MLS Cup Finals. Anders Dreyer was named MLS Newcomer of the Year and was a finalist for the league's most valuable player award.

== Los Angeles Football Club - Major League Soccer (MLS) ==
Tom Penn served as the founding president of Los Angeles Football Club (LAFC) and played a central role in organizing the club’s ownership group and establishing its early vision. He helped assemble a consortium of investors and worked with Peter Guber and other partners to secure an expansion franchise in Major League Soccer following the dissolution of Chivas USA. Penn organized early strategic planning sessions with the ownership group to define the club’s identity as a downtown Los Angeles team closely connected to the city’s culture and community. He also helped oversee the development of the club’s $350-million home venue, Banc of California Stadium, built at Exposition Park near the Los Angeles Memorial Coliseum. Under his leadership, LAFC launched its inaugural MLS season in 2018 after being built from scratch with no pre-existing roster, staff, or infrastructure. In 2018, Penn was named LA Sports Executive of the Year by the Los Angeles Sports Council. Penn is considered an expert and often speaks about the launching of new soccer teams, brands and the creation of supporter culture and community in the United States.

== NBA executive ==
In 2012, Penn was widely reported as being close to accepting a position as general manager of the Philadelphia 76ers. He instead re-signed with ESPN. From 2007 to 2010, he spent four seasons with the Portland Trail Blazers as the vice president of basketball operations and assistant general manager. Penn is an expert on the NBA salary cap and collective bargaining agreement. Penn worked with general manager Kevin Pritchard as they restored the Blazers from the "Jail Blazers" era. The Blazers won 54 games in 2008–09 and again reached 50 wins in 2009–10 in spite of injuries to key players. During the summer of 2009, Penn was offered the general manager job with the Minnesota Timberwolves, but he turned it down, deciding to stay with the Blazers after a promotion to vice president of basketball operations.

Penn worked with the Vancouver / Memphis Grizzlies as assistant general manager and legal counsel from 2000 to 2007. For five of those seasons in Memphis, he worked closely with Jerry West and Chuck Daly. The Grizzlies made the playoffs three straight seasons but never advanced passed the first round. In 1999, Penn worked as part of prospective NBA owner Michael Heisley's NBA acquisition team. Penn worked with Dick Versace and Heisley's team to help guide Heisley through the NBA acquisition process until Heisley ultimately purchased the Vancouver Grizzlies in May 2000. After one season in Vancouver, Heisley moved the team to Memphis. As Assistant GM of Basketball Operations, Penn had an active role in the relocation of Basketball Operations, building the practice facility, and the stadium design and build of FedExForm in Memphis.

== ESPN analyst ==
As an NBA analyst, Penn is regularly featured as a basketball operations expert on advanced analytics, salary cap issues, the NBA draft, player trades and collective bargaining issues.

Penn started working with ESPN during the 2010 NBA Draft, and during the free agency period of 2010, he operated ESPN's cap machine on SportsCenter, where he manipulated a touchscreen to show potential destinations for LeBron James and other marquee free agents. Penn has also been on ESPN using the ESPN Trade Machine to break down NBA trades. He left ESPN in 2018 to join Turner Sports.

== Sports Leadership Institute ==
The Sports Leadership Institute (SLI) is a company that organizes private leadership summits for global sports owners, pro sports executives, major college Athletic Directors, and professional athletes. Penn founded the company in 2011, and SLI organized the Global Sports Summit in Aspen, Global Sports Management Summit in Chicago, and Collegiate Sports Summit in Santa Monica.

== Agent and Lawyer ==
Penn was a lawyer and a player agent. He worked mostly as a criminal defense attorney and acted in 20-plus cases including murder, armed robbery and other serious felony cases. He also was a basketball player agent and organized tours of Europe with free agent players. Upper Deck Company—the trading card company—was his sponsor for the tours and the team was called the "Upper Deck All-Stars". Fox Sports Chicago filmed a documentary movie about one of the tours called Over There.

== St. Jude Children's Research Hospital ==
Penn has been a member of the Board of Governors of St. Jude Children's Research Hospital since 2002. He helped found for St. Jude an NBA Cares program that raises awareness and funds to fight childhood cancer. For the 2010-11 NBA Season, Hoops for St. Jude features the endorsement of NBA stars Dwyane Wade, Dwight Howard, Pau Gasol, Kevin Love, Rudy Gay, David Lee, Steve Blake, and coach George Karl. Penn was instrumental in spearheading the partnership and building of Memphis Grizzlies House on the St. Jude Campus. Penn also served on the board of directors of the Children's Cancer Association, a Portland-based charity that provides services and programs to children and families who are traumatized by cancer and other diseases.
