= 2019 MLS All-Star Game =

Soccer game played in Orlando, Florida

2019 MLS All-Star Game Presented by Target
Target All-Star Orlando '19
- Event: 2019 Major League Soccer season
MLS All-Stars	Atlético Madrid
(United States) (Canada)	(Spain)
0	3
- Date: July 31, 2019
- Venue: Exploria Stadium, Orlando, Florida
- Most Valuable Player: Marcos Llorente (Atlético Madrid)
- Referee: Drew Fischer (Canada)
- Attendance: 25,527

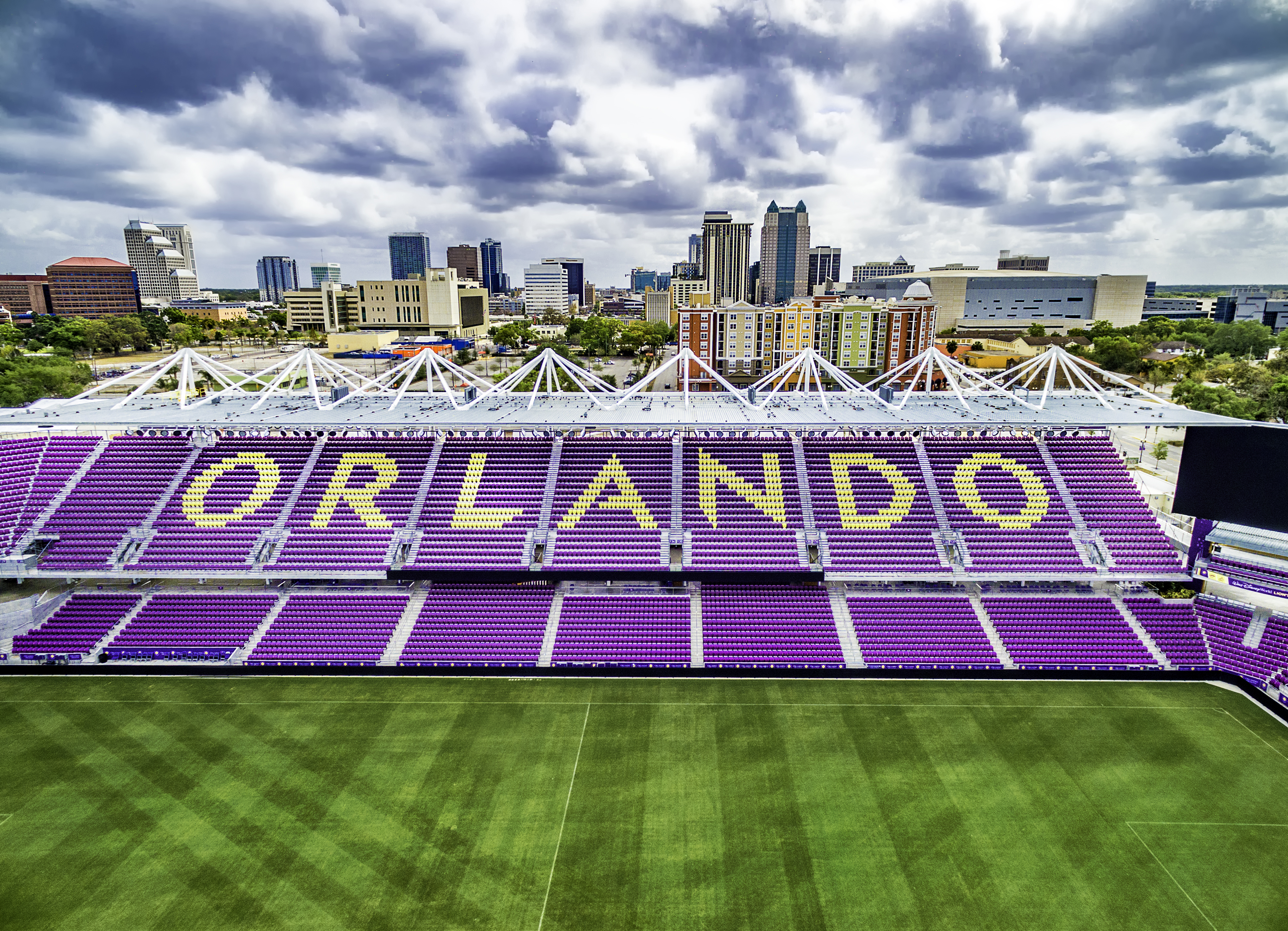
The match was held at Exploria Stadium in Orlando, Florida.

The 2019 Major League Soccer All-Star Game was the 24th edition of the annual Major League Soccer All-Star Game. It was held on July 31 at Exploria Stadium in Orlando, Florida, against Spanish club Atlético Madrid. Atlético won the game 3–0.

The game was televised domestically on FS1 and UniMás in the US, on TSN and TVA Sports in Canada and in more than 170 other countries around the world.

== Pre-match ==
In September 2018, MLS announced that Orlando would host the All-Star Game "in recognition of Orlando City Soccer Club’s emergence as a preeminent organization, Orlando City Stadium’s stature as one of North America’s elite soccer venues, and the overwhelming support of soccer fans in the community." Atlético Madrid was confirmed as the match's opponents in May 2019. Atlético was the 13th different European side to feature in the event and the second from La Liga following city rivals Real Madrid's 2017 match-up in Chicago.

MLS All-Star Week was a five-day program of entertainment and fan experiences. On June 13, it was announced multi-platinum Latin pop singer Prince Royce would headline the 2019 edition of the MLS All-Star Concert which also featured A-Trak. The concert was free to attend for the public and was held on July 27 at Wall Street Plaza. On July 28, there was an eMLS All-Star Challenge where professional eMLS gamers paired up with the likes Landon Donovan and Diego Forlán to play FIFA. The tournament was won by Orlando City's FIFA Abe and guest player AnthFifa who won a 64-player amateur competition earlier in the day.

As is tradition, Orlando also hosted the Homegrown Game that runs parallel to the All-Star Game. The game saw a selection of the best young Homegrown Players in MLS play Mexican youth team Chivas U-20s. The Homegrowns won the match on penalties after the game finished in a 2–2 draw.

Following the Homegrown game, MLS debuted a new skills challenge event, pitting three teams composed of All-Stars (Wayne Rooney, Jonathan dos Santos and Carlos Vela), Atlético Madrid players (Koke, Héctor Herrera and João Félix) as well as players from host side Orlando City SC (Nani, Sebas Méndez and Chris Mueller) against each other in a series of games created by F2Freestylers to test creativity, control and accuracy. Both events were held on July 30 at ESPN Wide World of Sports Complex, the same venue as the NFL's similarly-themed Skills Showdown during the Pro Bowl. Orlando City won after Nani hit the crossbar with the last kick of the competition, winning $25,000 for the Orlando City Foundation.

== Match rules ==
- Unlimited substitutions
- Penalty shoot-out if tied through full-time; no extra time

== Squads ==
=== MLS All-Stars ===
Note: Flags indicate national team as defined under FIFA eligibility rules; some limited exceptions apply. Players may hold more than one non-FIFA nationality.

No.	Pos.	Nation	Player
1	GK	USA	Brad Guzan (Atlanta United FC)
5	DF	ARG	Leandro González Pírez (Atlanta United FC)
7	FW	VEN	Josef Martínez (Atlanta United FC)
8	MF	MEX	Jonathan dos Santos (LA Galaxy)
9	FW	SWE	Zlatan Ibrahimović (LA Galaxy)
10	FW	MEX	Carlos Vela (captain) (Los Angeles FC)
11	MF	ARG	Maximiliano Moralez (New York City FC)
12	MF	USA	Paxton Pomykal (FC Dallas)
13	FW	USA	Chris Wondolowski (San Jose Earthquakes)
14	MF	URU	Nicolás Lodeiro (Seattle Sounders FC)
15	MF	CAN	Mark-Anthony Kaye (Los Angeles FC)
16	FW	URU	Diego Rossi (Los Angeles FC)
17	MF	POR	Nani (Orlando City SC)

No.	Pos.	Nation	Player
18	GK	USA	Nick Rimando (Real Salt Lake)
19	DF	MAD	Romain Métanire (Minnesota United FC)
20	MF	ESP	Alejandro Pozuelo (Toronto FC)
21	MF	COL	Diego Chará (Portland Timbers)
22	MF	ARG	Gonzalo Martínez (Atlanta United FC)
23	FW	ENG	Wayne Rooney (D.C. United)
24	DF	USA	Matt Hedges (FC Dallas)
25	DF	USA	Walker Zimmerman (Los Angeles FC)
26	GK	JAM	Andre Blake (Philadelphia Union)
27	MF	ARG	Esequiel Barco (Atlanta United FC)
28	DF	USA	Graham Zusi (Sporting Kansas City)
31	DF	GER	Bastian Schweinsteiger (Chicago Fire)
92	DF	JAM	Kemar Lawrence (New York Red Bulls)

- Manager: (Republic of Ireland) James O'Connor (Orlando City SC)

=== Atlético Madrid ===
Note: Flags indicate national team as defined under FIFA eligibility rules; some limited exceptions apply. Players may hold more than one non-FIFA nationality.

No.	Pos.	Nation	Player
1	GK	ESP	Antonio Adán
6	MF	ESP	Koke (captain)
7	FW	POR	João Félix
8	MF	ESP	Saúl
9	FW	ESP	Álvaro Morata
10	FW	ARG	Ángel Correa
11	MF	FRA	Thomas Lemar
12	DF	BRA	Renan Lodi
13	GK	SLO	Jan Oblak
14	MF	ESP	Marcos Llorente
15	DF	MNE	Stefan Savić
16	MF	MEX	Héctor Herrera
17	FW	SRB	Ivan Šaponjić

No.	Pos.	Nation	Player
18	DF	BRA	Felipe
19	FW	ESP	Diego Costa
20	MF	ESP	Vitolo
22	DF	ESP	Mario Hermoso
23	DF	ENG	Kieran Trippier
30	DF	ESP	Javi Montero
32	MF	ESP	Rodrigo Riquelme
33	DF	ESP	Carlos Isaac
34	FW	ESP	Sergio Camello
35	DF	ESP	Manu Sánchez
36	MF	URU	Juan Manuel Sanabria
37	GK	ESP	Álex dos Santos
38	MF	ESP	Toni Moya

- Manager: (Argentina) Diego Simeone

== Match ==
2019 MLS All-Star Game
July 31, 2019
8:42 p.m. EDT

MLS All-Stars (United States) (Canada)	0–3	(Spain) Atlético Madrid
	Report	Llorente 43'; Félix 85'; Costa 90+3'

Exploria Stadium, Orlando, Florida
Attendance: 25,527
Referee: Drew Fischer (Canada)

MLS All-Stars	Atlético Madrid

GK	1	(United States) Brad Guzan	(substituted off) 30'
DF	28	(United States) Graham Zusi	(substituted off) 46'
DF	25	(United States) Walker Zimmerman	(substituted off) 46'
DF	24	(United States) Matt Hedges	(substituted off) 46'
DF	92	(Jamaica) Kemar Lawrence	(substituted off) 46'
MF	21	(Colombia) Diego Chará	(substituted off) 46'
MF	10	(Mexico) Carlos Vela (c)	(substituted off) 46'
MF	20	(Spain) Alejandro Pozuelo	(substituted off) 46'
MF	23	(England) Wayne Rooney	(substituted off) 46'
MF	17	(Portugal) Nani	(substituted off) 46'
FW	9	(Sweden) Zlatan Ibrahimović	(substituted off) 30'
Substitutes:
GK	18	(United States) Nick Rimando	(substituted on) 59'
GK	26	(Jamaica) Andre Blake	(substituted on) 30' (substituted off) 59'
DF	19	(Madagascar) Romain Métanire	(substituted on) 46'
DF	5	(Argentina) Leandro González Pírez	(substituted on) 46'
MF	31	(Germany) Bastian Schweinsteiger	(substituted on) 46'
MF	11	(Argentina) Maximiliano Moralez	(substituted on) 46' (substituted off) 73'
MF	8	(Mexico) Jonathan dos Santos	(substituted on) 46'
MF	14	(Uruguay) Nicolás Lodeiro	(substituted on) 46'
MF	22	(Argentina) Gonzalo Martínez	(substituted on) 46'
MF	12	(United States) Paxton Pomykal	(substituted on) 73'
MF	15	(Canada) Mark-Anthony Kaye	(substituted on) 46'
MF	27	(Argentina) Ezequiel Barco	(substituted on) 73'
FW	13	(United States) Chris Wondolowski	(substituted on) 59'
FW	7	(Venezuela) Josef Martínez	(substituted on) 30' (substituted off) 59'
FW	16	(Uruguay) Diego Rossi	(substituted on) 46' (substituted off) 73'
Manager:
(Republic of Ireland) James O'Connor

GK	1	(Spain) Antonio Adán (c)	(substituted off) 65'
DF	33	(Spain) Carlos Isaac	(substituted off) 56'
DF	18	(Brazil) Felipe	(substituted off) 56'
DF	22	(Spain) Mario Hermoso	(substituted off) 59'
DF	35	(Spain) Manu Sánchez	(substituted off) 58'
MF	36	(Uruguay) Juan Manuel Sanabria	(substituted off) 35'
MF	14	(Spain) Marcos Llorente	(substituted off) 57'
MF	16	(Mexico) Héctor Herrera	(substituted off) 56'
MF	20	(Spain) Vitolo	(substituted off) 57'
FW	10	(Argentina) Ángel Correa	(substituted off) 56'
FW	32	(Spain) Rodrigo Riquelme	(substituted off) 58'
Substitutes:
GK	13	(Slovenia) Jan Oblak	(substituted on) 65'
GK	37	(Spain) Álex dos Santos
DF	15	(Montenegro) Stefan Savić	(substituted on) 56'
DF	23	(England) Kieran Trippier	(substituted on) 57'
DF	12	(Brazil) Renan Lodi	(substituted on) 56'
DF	30	(Spain) Javi Montero	(substituted on) 59'
MF	6	(Spain) Koke	(substituted on) 56'
MF	8	(Spain) Saúl	(substituted on) 57'
MF	11	(France) Thomas Lemar	(substituted on) 58'
MF	38	(Spain) Toni Moya	(substituted on) 35' (substituted off) 56'
FW	19	(Spain) Diego Costa	(substituted on) 56'
FW	17	(Serbia) Ivan Šaponjić	(substituted on) 82'
FW	34	(Spain) Sergio Camello	(substituted on) 58' (substituted off) 82'
FW	7	(Portugal) João Félix	(substituted on) 56'
Manager:
(Argentina) Diego Simeone

Most valuable player:
(Spain) Marcos Llorente (Atlético Madrid)

Assistant referees:
Brian Dunn
Logan Brown
Fourth official:
Timothy Ford
Video assistant referee:
Edvin Jurisevic

Match rules

- 90 minutes.
- Unlimited substitutions.
- No extra time.
- Penalty shoot-out if scores still level.
