= Carlos Vela =

Mexican footballer (born 1989)

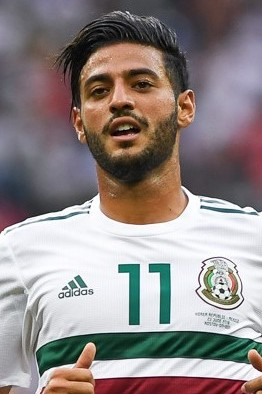
- Vela with Mexico at the 2018 FIFA World Cup

Personal information
- Full name: Carlos Alberto Vela Garrido
- Date of birth: 1 March 1989 (age 37)
- Place of birth: Cancún, Quintana Roo, Mexico
- Height: 1.78 m (5 ft 10 in)
- Positions: Forward; winger; attacking midfielder

Youth career
- 2002–2005: Guadalajara
- 2005–2006: Arsenal

Senior career*
Years	Team	Apps	(Gls)
2005	Guadalajara	0	(0)
2005–2012	Arsenal	29	(3)
2005–2006	→ Celta Vigo (loan)	0	(0)
2006–2007	→ Salamanca (loan)	31	(8)
2007–2008	→ Osasuna (loan)	33	(3)
2010–2011	→ West Bromwich Albion (loan)	8	(2)
2011–2012	→ Real Sociedad (loan)	35	(12)
2012–2018	Real Sociedad	184	(54)
2018–2024	Los Angeles FC	152	(78)
Total		472	(160)

International career
2005	Mexico U17	8	(5)
2007	Mexico U20	8	(0)
2007–2018	Mexico	72	(19)
Medal record
Men's football
Representing Mexico
FIFA U-17 World Cup
Winner	2005 Peru
CONCACAF Gold Cup
Winner	2009 United States
Winner	2015 United States–Canada
CONCACAF Cup
Winner	2015 United States
- * Club domestic league appearances and goals

Carlos Alberto Vela Garrido (Spanish pronunciation: [ˈkaɾ.los ˈβe.la]; born 1 March 1989) is a Mexican former professional footballer. A versatile offensive player, Vela could be deployed as a forward, winger, and attacking midfielder.

Vela began his career at Mexican club Guadalajara, where he caught the eye of several European clubs after finishing as the top scorer at the 2005 FIFA U-17 World Championship, ultimately joining Premier League club Arsenal that year. After joining Arsenal, he had loan spells at Spanish clubs Salamanca and Osasuna, as well as at English club West Bromwich Albion, before settling at Real Sociedad in 2011, initially on loan and then permanently the following season. In his six-year spell with La Real, Vela played in 250 matches and scored 73 goals. He is widely regarded as one of the best foreign players ever to play for the club. In January 2018, he joined Los Angeles FC, winning the Supporters' Shield and the MLS Golden Boot in his second year, and setting a new league record for most goals in a season, with 34. He was also voted Most Valuable Player. In 2022, Vela would win a second Supporters' Shield as well as lift the MLS Cup, before announcing his retirement in 2025.

Vela made his debut with the senior Mexico national team in 2007 in a friendly match against Brazil, and scored his first goal for his country in a friendly against Guatemala. He participated in Mexico's CONCACAF Gold Cup victory in 2009, and participated in the 2010 FIFA World Cup in South Africa. Vela rejected all subsequent call-ups for more than three years, including friendlies, World Cup qualifiers, and various major tournaments including the 2014 FIFA World Cup, citing various reasons for his refusals. In November 2014, Vela made his return to the national team and participated in the 2017 FIFA Confederations Cup and 2018 World Cup.

== Early life ==
Carlos Alberto Vela Garrido was born 1 March 1989 in Cancún, Quintana Roo, Mexico, to Enrique Vela, an iron welder from Campeche, and Nella Garrido, a stay-at-home mother from Tabasco. His father played semi-professional football but an injury caused by a torn ligament caused him to retire. Vela's father enrolled him into local football teams. Vela's first club was Ko Cha Wolis, which translates to "Kicking Round Ball" in Mayan. He learned a lot and made significant development and progress during his time spent there, according to Félix Alcalá, his coach at the time.

In school, Vela played both basketball and football simultaneously, which caused many problems between his coaches. His father made him decide to focus on only one sport at the age of 12, in which Vela chose football. Enrique Vela was frustrated at the fact that his son was not being scouted due to living in Cancún. Around the same time, José Luis Real of C.D. Guadalajara's youth system sent scouts to Cancún in 2001, where Vela caught their eye. He was summoned to a youth tournament in Buenos Aires with Guadalajara as a small trial period with unpaid expenses.

In 2003, during a local competition held in Ciudad Victoria, Vela was seen and was presented with offers with local teams of the Primera División. He eventually joined Guadalajara in 2003, though he never received a call up to the club's first-team squad, thus not being able to make his professional debut in Mexico.

== Club career ==
=== Guadalajara ===
Vela's career started with Guadalajara, alongside his brother Alejandro. After winning the 2005 FIFA U-17 World Championship with Mexico and finishing as the top scorer with five goals, Jorge Vergara, owner and club president of Guadalajara, agreed to sign him. Since Vela's family lived in the then-recently-storm-stricken Cancún, he asked that the club help relocate them as a condition of his signing. Vela had previously shown his great affection to his father, whose birthday fell on the day on which Mexico beat Brazil in the final of the U-17 World Cup, by carrying the cup to his father and dedicating his Golden Boot to him.

=== Arsenal ===
Vela attracted interest from a number of European clubs, and eventually Arsenal won the race for his signature in November 2005 on a five-year deal for a £125,000 fee that rose to £550,000 after he played 50 first-team games. However, since English work permit restrictions for non-EU citizens prevented him from playing in England, Arsenal quickly loaned him out to Spanish club Celta Vigo in February 2006, but he was returned right away with no games played.

==== Salamanca and Osasuna loans ====
At the end of the season, Vela was sent to Spanish Segunda División club Salamanca, on loan for the 2006–07 season. He had a successful stay there, creating many of Salamanca's 53 goals, eight of which he scored himself.

After his loan spell with Salamanca ended, bigger clubs of La Liga, such as Levante, Osasuna, and Almería, were all interested in taking him on loan from Arsenal for whom he was still ineligible to play as he still had yet to receive a work permit. Eventually, a one-year loan move to Osasuna was agreed, with the option of an extension for another year. No permanent option, however, had been included in the deal. On 31 October 2007, he scored his first goal with Osasuna, in a match against Real Betis, a performance that went on to earn several plaudits from the Spanish press.

=== Return to Arsenal ===
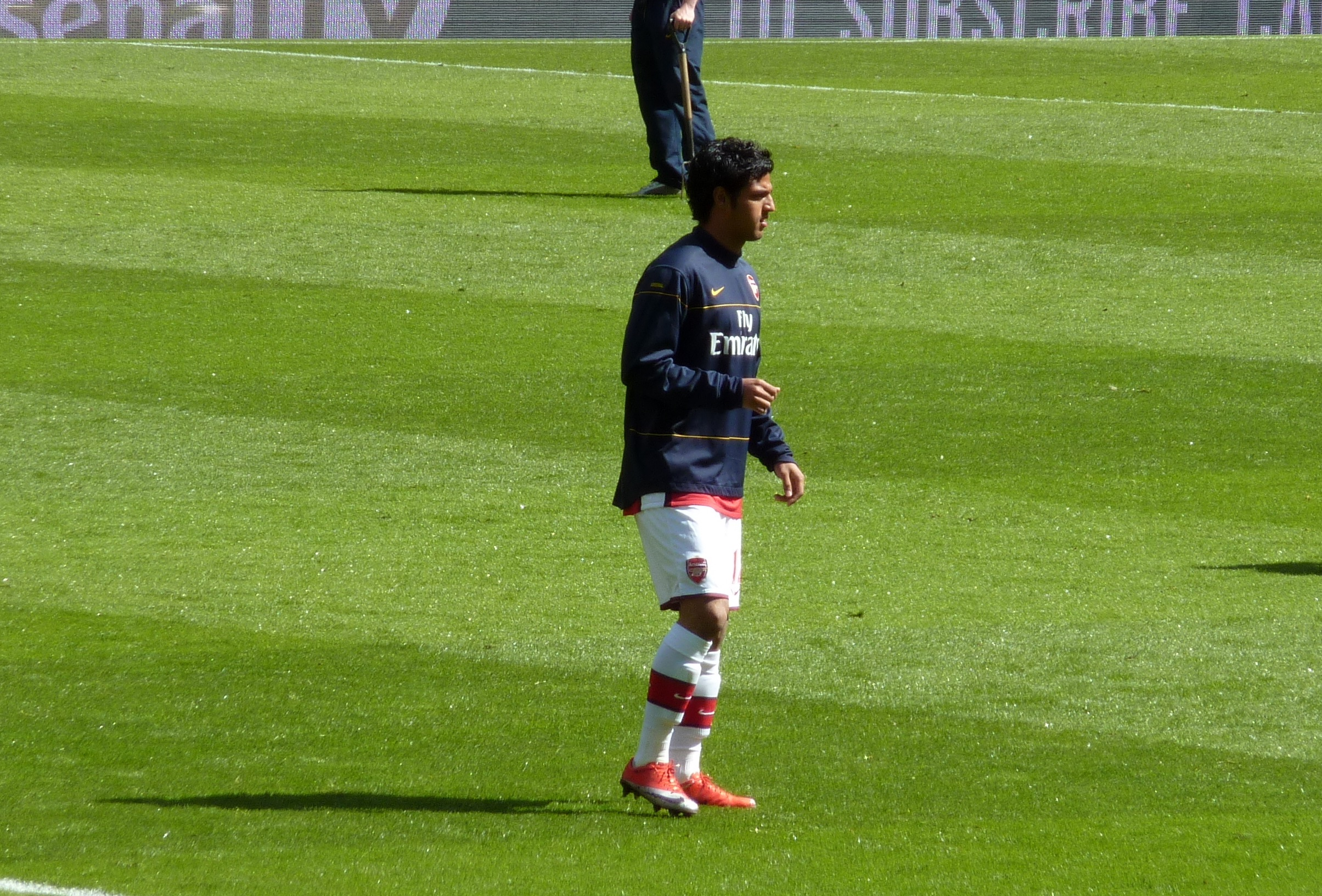
Vela at Arsenal (26 April 2009)

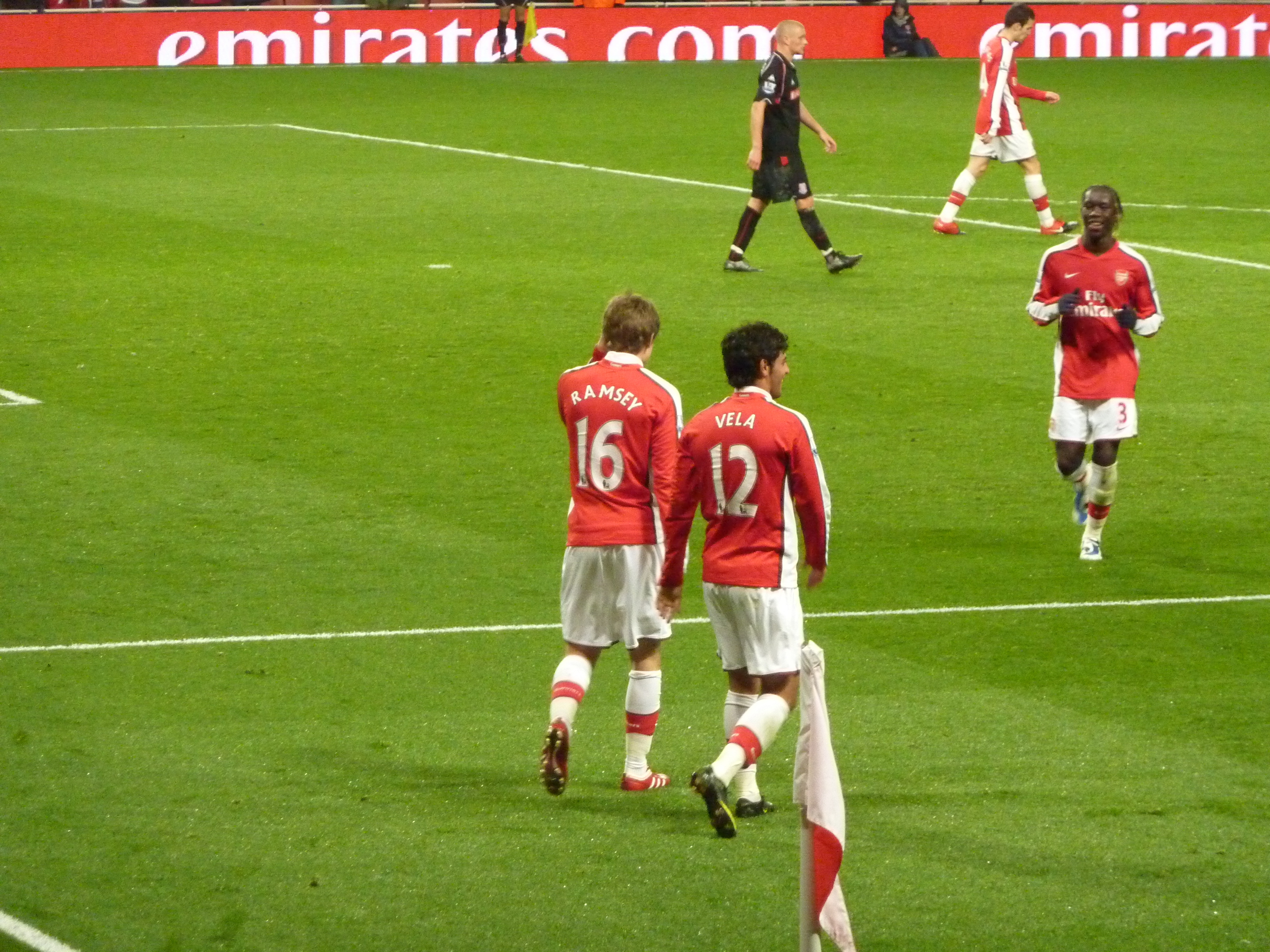
Vela (right) and former teammate Aaron Ramsey against Stoke City (5 December 2009)

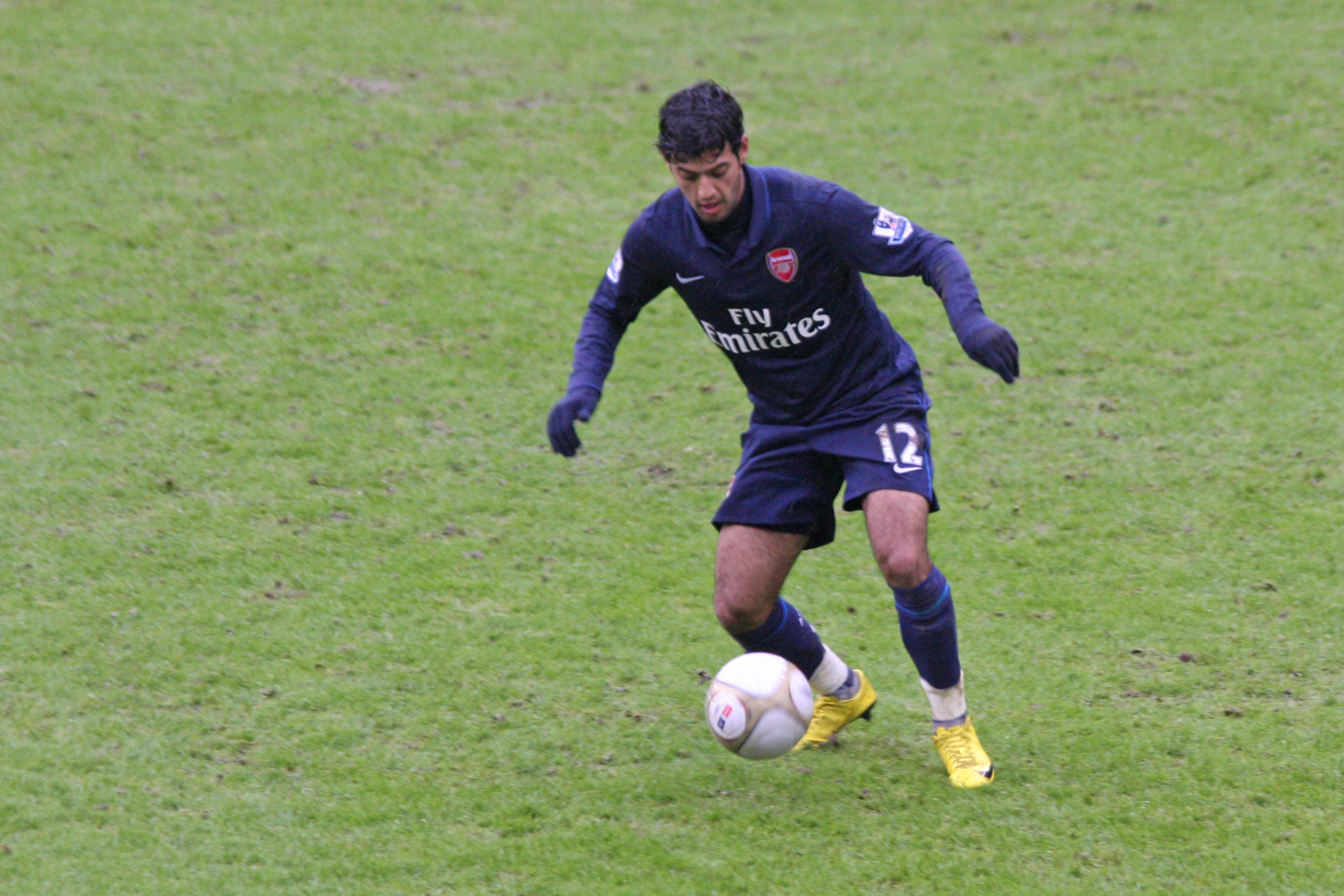
Vela playing for Arsenal (2010)

On 22 May 2008, Vela was granted a work permit that allowed him to play in England. Arsenal manager Arsène Wenger confirmed that Vela would be involved with the first team in the coming season and that he viewed Vela as a striker in Eduardo's mould.

Vela made his competitive debut for Arsenal on 30 August 2008 in their Premier League match against Newcastle United, coming on as a substitute for Robin van Persie in the 63rd minute. Arsenal won the match 3–0. In his full debut on 23 September 2008, against Sheffield United in the League Cup, Vela scored a hat-trick in a 6–0 win, with his second goal voted as one of Arsenal's Greatest 50 Goals. The match was also notable for featuring Arsenal's youngest ever side, with an average age of 19.

On 8 March 2009, in the FA Cup fifth round tie against Burnley, Vela scored the first goal in a 3–0 win by chipping the ball over the keeper and into the goal. He scored his first goal in the Premier League for Arsenal away to Portsmouth on 2 May 2009 making him just the second Mexican player to score a goal in the Premier League. On 28 April, Vela was excluded from Arsenal's training session as a precaution due to the 2009 swine flu outbreak. Two of Vela's friends from Mexico visited him over the weekend and Arsenal were asked to keep him away. He returned to training the next day, however, after being given the all-clear.

Vela missed Arsenal's pre-season campaign of the 2009–10 season after suffering an ankle injury which kept him out until September. He returned to action on 22 September by coming off the bench in Arsenal's 2–0 win by assisting the first and scoring the second goal against West Bromwich Albion in the League Cup. On 21 November 2009, he made his first appearance of the season in the Premier League away to Sunderland, playing 21 minutes after coming on as a substitute for Eduardo. Vela renewed his contract with Arsenal on 10 December 2009. On 4 May 2010, Vela played his 50th game in an Arsenal shirt, against Blackburn Rovers. On 9 May, he scored the fourth goal of Arsenal's victory over Fulham.

Vela scored his first goal of the season against Bolton Wanderers in a 4–1 home win on 11 September 2010. On 15 September, Vela scored two goals in the UEFA Champions League when Arsenal beat Portuguese side Braga 6–0.

==== West Bromwich Albion (loan) ====
On 28 January 2011, Vela joined West Brom on loan until the end of the 2010–11 season. He made his debut on 1 February 2011 in a 2–2 draw against Wigan Athletic, playing 58 minutes of the game. He scored his first goal for the Baggies in his third match for the club on 20 February 2011, with West Brom's local rivals Wolverhampton Wanderers on the verge of a first win at The Hawthorns since 1996, Vela came off the bench to score a 92nd-minute equaliser to ensure the game ended 1-1. Vela once again scored for West Brom in the dying minutes of a game against Stoke City to salvage a 1–1 draw after coming on as a late substitute.

==== Real Sociedad (loan) ====
On 15 August 2011, Arsenal announced that Vela would be loaned out to Spanish club Real Sociedad, subject to a medical. After passing the medical exams, he was officially presented on 17 August 2011. On 4 December 2011, Vela scored a bicycle kick goal to equalise for Real Sociedad, his second of the season, against Málaga before teammate Diego Ifrán scored a late winner to make the score 3–2. Vela scored the only goal for Real Sociedad in a 2–1 loss to Barcelona, making it his third goal for the season.

In early February 2012, rumours of Vela's future at Arsenal began to surface, claiming that he wished to stay in Spain with Real Sociedad. Vela has been quoted saying, "I don't want to return to Arsenal. I have asked my agent to negotiate with Arsenal to stay here."

=== Real Sociedad ===
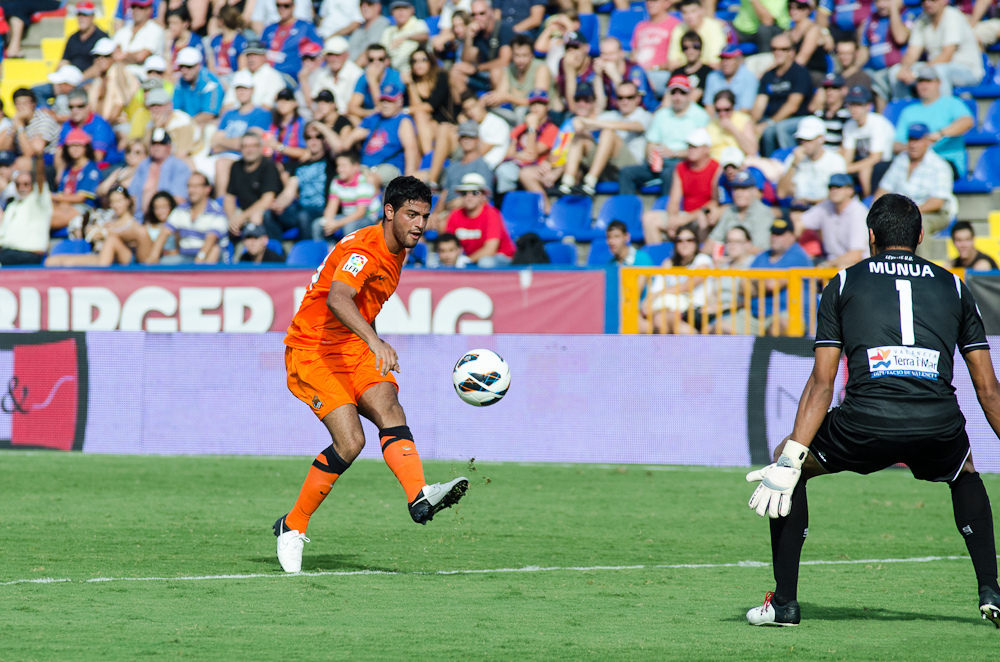
Vela shooting against Levante goalkeeper Gustavo Munúa (September 2012)

After making over 30 appearances in all competitions and scoring 12 goals, Vela was officially transferred to Real Sociedad from Arsenal on 17 July 2012, for an undisclosed fee. The deal was confirmed by Arsenal on 10 August. He was given the number 11 shirt. His performances led him to be named Best Player of the Season.

During the 2012–13 season, Vela played predominantly on the right wing and scored 14 goals, as well as having nine assists. There had been speculation in the media that he would return to Arsenal, however no talks took place between the two teams.

Vela started the 2013–14 season, scoring once and assisting the other in the team's 2–0 win over Getafe. He scored twice, a header and a stoppage-time individual goal, to confirm Real Sociedad's progression to the group stages of the Champions League at Lyon's expense. On 23 November, he scored four goals in La Real's 4–3 win over Celta Vigo.

On 20 January 2014, it was announced that Vela had won La Liga Player of the Month for December after his performances against clubs such as Real Betis, Granada, Real Madrid, and Barcelona. On 5 May 2014, Vela scored in the 1–1 draw against Granada. The goal was Vela's 15th league strike of the season—surpassing his tally of 14 from the previous season—and his 20th in all competitions. He was nominated at the season's LFP Awards for the Best Forward in the league, losing out to Cristiano Ronaldo. On 26 May, Vela was voted by fans as Best Player of the Season. On 24 June, Vela signed a four-year contract extension which will keep him at Real Sociedad until 2018.

Vela scored his first goal of the 2014–15 season in Real Sociedad's 4–2 win against Real Madrid on 1 September 2014. On 28 November, he scored all of the side's goals as they beat Elche 3–0 for new manager David Moyes' first victory at the club. These were three of his four league goals that month, which once again earned him the La Liga's Player of the Month award.

On 31 January 2015, during Real Sociedad's 1–4 league defeat to Real Madrid, Vela was subbed off in the 17th minute due to a knee injury, which was later reported to be ligament damage, and would require surgery. Though initially reported that Vela would miss the remainder of the season, it was confirmed through a club statement that the injury was an internal meniscus tear and that Vela would be out for two months. He made his return on 22 March against Córdoba, being substituted on for Esteban Granero in the 66th minute and providing an assist in Real Sociedad's 3–1 win.

On 25 October 2015, Vela scored his first two goals of the 2015–16 season in Real Sociedad's 4–0 win over Levante.

On 9 March 2016, it was reported that Vela had been separated from the first team after he failed to report for training two days earlier, claiming he was suffering from gastroenteritis, though a photo began circulating on social media of him attending a Chris Brown concert in Madrid hours after the team's 1–1 draw against Levante. He was ultimately fined by the club and ruled out for the team's next match against Celta Vigo. Sociedad manager Eusebio Sacristán, however, named Vela in the squad for the match against Celta, appearing as a second-half substitute in the 0–1 loss.

On 10 April 2017, Vela played in his 200th league match for Real Sociedad in the side's 3–1 victory against Sporting de Gijón, as well as becoming the foreign player with the second-most appearances for the club behind Darko Kovačević.

On 8 August 2017, Real Sociedad announced an agreement with Major League Soccer for Vela to move to the league in 2018. Two days later, it was announced that he would join expansion team Los Angeles FC as their first Designated Player when the transfer window opened on 1 January 2018.

On 20 December 2017, Vela played in his final match for Real Sociedad, scoring the final goal in the team's 3–1 win over Sevilla. He is the second-highest Mexican goalscorer in La Liga history with 69 goals, behind Hugo Sánchez. Vela is widely regarded as one of the best foreign players ever to have played for Real Sociedad.

=== Los Angeles FC ===
==== 2018 season ====
On 8 August 2017, it was announced that Vela had been signed by Los Angeles FC, becoming the first designated player of the team and officially joining the team on 1 January 2018.

On 4 March 2018, Vela made his debut with Los Angeles FC, providing an assist for Diego Rossi's goal in the team's 1–0 victory over Seattle Sounders FC. On 10 March, Vela scored his first goal with Los Angeles, scoring the final goal in a 5–1 thrashing against Real Salt Lake. On 31 March, Vela became the first player ever to score in the El Tráfico derby against LA Galaxy; he scored the first two goals of the game in Los Angeles' dramatic 3–4 defeat. On 13 April, he scored the first goal in a 2–0 win over Vancouver Whitecaps FC. A week later he converted a penalty during Los Angeles' 5–3 win over Montreal Impact. On 13 May, he scored Los Angeles' second goal in a 2–2 tie against New York City FC. A couple of days later he scored his teams' only goal against the Portland Timbers in a 2–1 loss.

On 26 July 2018, after conducting a popular vote on Twitter, Vela was voted to captain the MLS side in the 2018 MLS All-Star Game against Juventus, where they initially tied the match 1–1 but went on to lose 5–3 in penalties. Following the departure of club captain Laurent Ciman, Vela was named as succeeding captain. On 22 September 2018, Vela provided two assists to Walker Zimmerman in the 2–0 victory over San Jose Earthquakes. On 12 October, in a league match against Houston Dynamo, he was involved in all of his team's goals in a 4–2 victory as he scored a brace and contributed two assists. In November 2018, he was named into the MLS Best XI of 2018.

==== 2019 season ====
Prior to the beginning of the 2019 season, it was reported by Mundo Deportivo that there was interest from Spanish club Barcelona to acquire him on loan, with Vela eventually revealing "It was really close."

On 30 March 2019, Vela scored his first hat-trick with LAFC in their 5–0 away win against the San Jose Earthquakes. Vela scored both goals in a 2–3 loss to city rivals LA Galaxy on 19 July; his first goal was his 20th league goal of the season and he became the fastest player in MLS history to reach that milestone.

He was voted as captain for the second consecutive season via social media for the 2019 MLS All-Star Game against Atlético Madrid.

With his goal against Atlanta United FC on 26 July, Vela drew level with Erick Torres as the highest scoring Mexican in MLS history with 36 goals. On 17 August, Vela scored his 24th goal of the 2019 MLS season from the penalty spot in a 2–0 away win over Real Salt Lake, which saw LAFC clinch the playoffs. With this goal, Vela broke Sebastian Giovinco's 2015 MLS single-season record of most combined goals and assists, with his 39th point of the season (24 goals and 15 assists), one more than Giovinco's 38 (22 goals and 16 assists). On 25 September, Vela scored the opening goal in a 3–1 home win over the Houston Dynamo from the penalty spot; the victory saw LAFC clinch the Supporters' Shield. On 29 September, Vela scored his 31st goal of the 2019 MLS season in a 1–1 away draw against Minnesota United FC, equaling Josef Martínez's record for most goals in a single MLS season. He broke Martínez's record on 6 October, when he scored a hat-trick in a 3–1 home win over the Colorado Rapids. He finished the season with a record 34 goals and 15 assists, for a combined record of 49 points, which earned him the MLS Golden Boot award as the league's top-scorer.

In the playoffs, on 24 October, Vela scored twice and assisted once in a 5–3 home win over the LA Galaxy in the Western Conference semi-finals. Los Angeles were eliminated in the Western Conference Finals, following a 3–1 home defeat to the Seattle Sounders on 29 October, in which Vela's impact was heavily stifled by the opposing team, who kept the ball away from him; as such, he only managed one shot on goal during the entire match. Vela finished the 2019 season by claiming the MLS Most Valuable Player Award for his performances, winning by a significant margin over Galaxy rival Zlatan Ibrahimović and Atlanta United FC forward Josef Martínez. He also finished in the global top ten of goalscorers with 38 goals.

==== 2020 season: CCL final ====
On 18 February 2020, Vela played his first professional match against a Mexican club, León, in the first leg of that year's CONCACAF Champions League round of 16 which ended in a 0–2 away loss. On 27 February, during the second leg of the round, Vela would score a brace, contributing to a 3–2 aggregate victory, helping LAFC qualify for the quarter-finals.

On 1 March, Vela scored LAFC's only goal against newcomers Inter Miami, which his team won 1–0. On 6 July, Los Angeles FC announced that Vela would be not traveling with the club for the MLS is Back Tournament in Orlando, Florida because of his wife's pregnancy. Vela returned to action with the team on 22 August, in a 2–0 loss to rivals LA Galaxy, but had to be substituted out due to an injury on his left knee, ruling him out for an indefinite amount of time. After two months, he returned to the playing field on 25 October facing LA Galaxy again, coming on as a second-half substitute and sealing the 2–0 victory with a chipped goal during stoppage time, thus becoming the leading scorer of El Tráfico history with 10 goals.

On 16 December, following the CONCACAF Champions League's presumption after the COVID-19 pandemic, Vela scored a penalty to equalize for LAFC in their quarter-final victory against Mexican side Cruz Azul, as they came from behind to advance to the next round. On 19 December, after his side were down 0–1 with 10 men, Vela scored a brace within the first two minutes of the second half in LAFC's semi-final victory against Club América, as they became the first MLS team to defeat three Mexican sides in the same Champions League tournament. Three days later, Vela played all 90 minutes in LAFC's 2–1 defeat to Tigres UANL in the final. He was subsequently included in the competition's best XI, having scored a total of five goals in the tournament.

==== 2021 season: Injuries ====
On 17 April 2021, Vela played his first match against new MLS club Austin FC. However, he was subbed at the 22nd minute due to injury. He returned on 16 May in a 2-0 loss to the Seattle Sounders, being subbed on at the 70th minute. On 23 June, Vela scored his first goal of the season against FC Dallas, which resulted in a 2-0 win for LAFC. During the match against Whitecaps, Vela injured his right quad and was subbed at the 16th minute. As a result, Vela missed the 2021 MLS All-Star Game. Vela finished the season with 5 goals.

==== 2022 season: First MLS Cup ====
On 26 February 2022, Vela kicked off the 2022 MLS Season with a hattrick, scoring all of his team's goals in the victory against Colorado Rapids. LAFC later won the 2022 MLS Cup on penalties, with Vela assisting Jesús Murillo's goal, as well as grabbing an assist each in the conference semis and conference finals. The Mexican forward scored 12 goals in all competitions, including a brace in a victory against Houston Dynamo on 19 September.

==== 2023 season: Defeats in three finals ====
On 11 April 2023, Vela scored a brace against the Whitecaps in the CCL quarter-final second leg. Five days later, Vela produced a MOTM performance in an El Tráfico victory, scoring a brace and adding an assist, as LAFC recorded its first ever victory at Dignity Health Sports Park. On 21 May, he scored a last minute penalty to give LAFC the win over San Jose Earthquakes. On 31 May, Vela participated in his second CONCACAF Champions League final; LAFC lost 2–1 at Estadio León, and later lost 0–1 at home in the second leg to finish as runner-ups for the second time in club history.

Vela would captain LAFC against UANL for the 2023 Campeones Cup on September 27, 2023, a match between the reigning winners of MLS and Liga MX. After a scoreless draw, LAFC lost 4–2 in a penalty shoot-out.

Vela's contract with LAFC ran out at the end of the 2023 season, and his last match was a 2–1 defeat against Columbus Crew in the MLS Cup Final. He made a personal-best 49 appearances throughout the season, and scored 14 goals.

==== 2024 season and retirement ====
On 16 September 2024, Vela re-signed with LAFC until the end of the 2024 season, with an option to add another year. When asked about his reasoning behind leaving the sport, Vela stated,

"I enjoyed it (the last few months without a team) much more than I had imagined. I've been doing the same thing for years, playing professionally since I was 16, but then you enjoy your family and other things that football sacrifices take away from you."

— Carlos Vela, speaking on beIN Sports

However, he only played four minutes since rejoining the team, and in November 2024 the club decided not to activate his 2025 option.

Vela announced his retirement from professional football on 27 May 2025.

== International career ==
=== Youth ===
Vela played in the 2005 FIFA U-17 World Championship, held in Peru, where he helped Mexico to victory. He went on to score three goals in the group stage, one against Uruguay in a 2–0 win and two against Australia in a 3–0 win. He also scored Mexico's final goal in a 3–1 victory against Costa Rica during extra time in the quarterfinals, and having reached the final against Brazil, he scored Mexico's first goal in their 3–0 victory. He subsequently finished as top scorer with five goals, claiming the Golden Boot.

Vela was part of the under-20 team that participated at the 2007 FIFA U-20 World Cup.

=== Senior ===
==== Early years ====
During his stay at Osasuna, Vela made his international debut for the senior national team on 12 September 2007, in a friendly match against Brazil, losing 3–1. On 18 October 2007, he scored his first senior international goal for Mexico in a friendly against Guatemala in Los Angeles.

On 8 June 2008, Vela scored his second senior international goal in a friendly against Peru in the 20th minute to help Mexico to a 4–0 victory. A match later for Mexico, he scored in their 2010 FIFA World Cup qualifying opener against Belize making the match 1–0. In the return leg against Belize, he again scored the opening goal of the match and beginning the 7–0 rout in favour of El Tri.

In July 2009, Vela represented Mexico at the 2009 CONCACAF Gold Cup. He started in Mexico's opener against Nicaragua. Five minutes into the match, an opposing player tackled Vela and he fell awkwardly on his right leg. X-rays, however, showed he did not break anything and could play again in the tournament. Mexico advanced to the semi-finals against Costa Rica, where Vela would make his return in the 81st minute. After extra time, the game was tied 1–1 and went to penalties. After Guillermo Ochoa saved Froylán Ledezma's penalty, Vela scored Mexico's fifth penalty to send them to the final. In the final against the United States, Vela was brought on at half time with the score deadlocked at 0–0. Mexico went on to defeat the United States 5–0 with Vela providing the pass to Giovani dos Santos for the first penalty, creating the second goal, scoring the third and assisting the fourth.

On 10 October 2009, during a World Cup qualifying match against El Salvador, Vela scored one goal and provided an assist in a 4–1 victory, helping Mexico for the tournament.

On 3 June 2010, Vela scored his first international goal against a team from Europe, in a friendly match against Italy. He scored the first goal of the game with an assist from Giovani dos Santos. Mexico would win the match 2–1. In the opening match of the tournament against hosts South Africa, he was a starting left-winger, coming out on the 69th minute for Cuauhtémoc Blanco in a 1–1 tie. In the following group match against France, Vela was subbed off in the 31st minute for Pablo Barrera due to injury and would miss the following matches against Uruguay and Argentina.

==== Hiatus ====
On 21 September 2010, the Mexican Football Federation announced that Vela and teammate Efraín Juárez would be suspended from the Mexico national team for six months for their involvement in a party on 7 September in Monterrey following a game with Colombia. Vela and 12 other players were also fined 50,000 Mexican pesos (approximately US$3,953 as of 24 September 2010), used to help the flood victims in the Mexican state of Veracruz.

After his suspension, Vela returned to the national team after head coach José Manuel de la Torre called him up for a friendly match against Venezuela in March 2011, his final match with the national team for three years. He was omitted from that year's Gold Cup which Mexico went on to win. Vela was included in the preliminary roster for the 2011 Copa América but Arsenal refused to allow him to go, citing that it wasn't a CONCACAF tournament. He refused a call-up to participate in the 2012 London Olympics, which Mexico went on to win, due to wanting to establish himself with his new club Real Sociedad. He declined a third time to join the national team in March 2013 for the 2014 World Cup qualifiers against the United States and Honduras for personal reasons.

After De La Torre was sacked, Vela declared his wish to return to play for Mexico. In September 2013, Víctor Manuel Vucetich called him up for World Cup qualifiers against Panama and Costa Rica; however, Vela declined once again to come back to the national team. Afterwards, Vucetich refused to make any more comments regarding Vela, calling it a "closed case". On 3 February 2014, new national team coach Miguel Herrera flew to Spain with officials from the Mexican Football Federation to meet with Vela and gauge his interest in representing the national team. After the meeting, Vela expressed that he was not "100 percent mentally ready to represent Mexico", subsequently ruling out his participation in the 2014 FIFA World Cup. Vela was at the peak of his career at that time.

==== Return ====
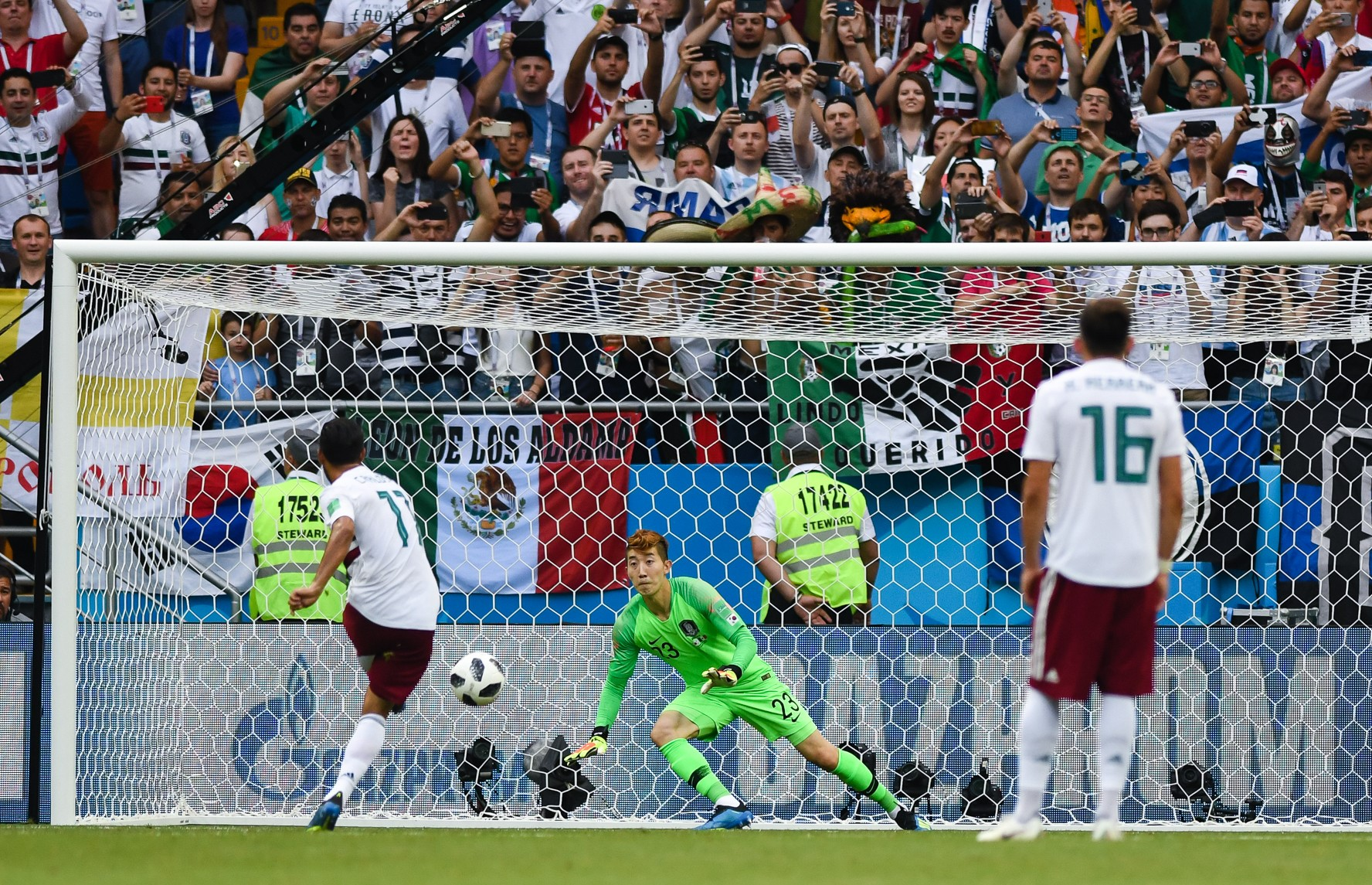
Vela converting a penalty kick against South Korea at the 2018 FIFA World Cup

In November 2014, after a three-year absence, Vela accepted a call up from Miguel Herrera to the national team for the friendly matches against the Netherlands and Belarus. He scored twice on his return as Mexico defeated the Dutch 3–2 at the Amsterdam Arena on 12 November.

Vela was called up to participate in the 2015 CONCACAF Gold Cup, scoring in the team's opening match against Cuba on 9 July. On 15 July, Vela scored his second goal in the competition in Mexico's 4–4 draw against Trinidad and Tobago. In the quarterfinal and semi-final matches against Costa Rica and Panama, respectively, Vela received two yellow cards, meaning he would miss the final against Jamaica, in which Mexico achieved a 3–1 victory. He was subsequently called up by Ricardo Ferretti for the CONCACAF Cup – a play-off match to determine CONCACAF's entry into the 2017 FIFA Confederations Cup – against the United States, appearing as an unused substitute in Mexico's 3–2 victory.

In May 2017, he was called up by Juan Carlos Osorio to be included in the roster to participate in the Confederations Cup in Russia. Appearing as a starter in Mexico's first group stage match against Portugal, he would provide a low cross assist for Javier Hernández to score Mexico's first goal in a match that was eventually tied 2–2. He would go on to appear in Mexico's final group stage match against Russia and third place play-off against Portugal.

In May 2018, Vela was named in Mexico's preliminary 28-man squad for the World Cup, and in June, was ultimately included in the final 23-man roster. On 23 June, in Mexico's second group stage match against South Korea, he scored their first goal via a penalty kick in the 2–1 victory; it was also his first World Cup goal for Mexico. He appeared in all group stage matches and the round of 16 loss against Brazil. Following the departure of manager Osorio, Ferretti was appointed as interim manager of the national team and did not include him in the roster for the post-World Cup September friendlies. Vela insisted on respecting Ferretti's decision and wished them luck.

In January 2019, Gerardo Martino was named as the new manager for the national team and did not call up Vela for his first friendlies in March, stating he wanted to see other players in action and that the door is not necessarily closed on future call-ups, although it was unclear if Vela wanted to continue his international career. In May, it was reported that Vela was not interested in being called up for the 2019 CONCACAF Gold Cup. In November, he stated that he is willing to return to the national team if called up. In May 2020, he declared that the 2018 World Cup was his final appearance with the national team.

== Style of play ==
Regarded as a promising player in his youth, gifted with skill and natural flair, former Arsenal manager Arsène Wenger described Vela as a player who was "...naturally gifted, quick, intelligent and with very good technique". He also labelled him as a "special talent", stating "I like [Vela's] intelligence and his pace. He scores goals but he can also create them."

Vela's playing style was described as being able to "beat his man off the dribble," and "his linking up with teammates presents danger. [Looking through his first season] shows his willingness to work combinations across the entire attacking third of the pitch."

A left-footed player, Vela was known for his speed, technique, and vision. Collin Carpio has noted that while Vela was typically deployed on the right wing, he could also play as a striker, commenting in 2016: "[w]hen he's in-form, the 27-year-old can be lethal cutting inside from the flanks, and he's proven that he can set up [sic] goals for his teammates."

Vela was also known for scoring chipped goals.

== Outside of football ==
=== Personal life ===
Carlos' older brother, Alejandro, is also a former professional footballer.

Vela became a father in November 2016 to a son Romeo, with his Spanish then-girlfriend Saioa Cañibano, whom he met during his time at Real Sociedad. Vela became a father for a second time in October 2020 to a daughter India, also with Saioa, whom he married.

Vela has stated he is not passionate about football, saying, "I really like basketball, I've always said that I would one thousand times rather watch a basketball game than a football one."

On 4 March 2020, Los Angeles FC announced that Vela had obtained a green card, qualifying him as a domestic player for Major League Soccer roster purposes.

On 8 January 2025, Vela's home in Malibu was destroyed in the Palisades Fire, but Vela and his family were able to escape without injury.

=== Media ===
He appeared on the North American front cover of the FIFA 11 video game along with Kaká and Landon Donovan. He would appear again on the FIFA 20 MVP Edition. During the 2019 Major League Soccer season Vela appeared in a Target commercial alongside LAFC teammate Adama Diomande and other MLS players.

== Career statistics ==
=== Club ===
Appearances and goals by club, season and competition
Club	Season	League			National cup (Note: Includes Copa del Rey, FA Cup, U.S. Open Cup)		League cup (Note: Includes EFL Cup, MLS Cup playoffs)		Continental		Other		Total	
Club	Season	Division	Apps	Goals	Apps	Goals	Apps	Goals	Apps	Goals	Apps	Goals	Apps	Goals
Arsenal	2005–06	Premier League	0	0	—		—		—		—		0	0
Arsenal	2008–09	Premier League	14	1	4	1	3	4	8 (Note: Appearances in UEFA Champions League)	0	—		29	6
Arsenal	2009–10	Premier League	11	1	2	0	2	1	5	0	—		20	2
Arsenal	2010–11	Premier League	4	1	1	0	4	0	4	2	—		13	3
Arsenal	Total		29	3	7	1	9	5	17	2	—		62	11
Celta Vigo (loan)	2005–06	La Liga	0	0	—		—		—		—		0	0
Salamanca (loan)	2006–07	Segunda División	31	8	1	0	—		—		—		32	8
Osasuna (loan)	2007–08	La Liga	33	3	—		—		—		—		33	3
West Bromwich Albion (loan)	2010–11	Premier League	8	2	—		—		—		—		8	2
Real Sociedad (loan)	2011–12	La Liga	35	12	2	0	—		—		—		37	12
Real Sociedad	2012–13	La Liga	35	14	2	0	—		—		—		37	14
Real Sociedad	2013–14	La Liga	37	16	7	2	—		8	3	—		52	21
Real Sociedad	2014–15	La Liga	29	9	1	1	—		2 (Note: Appearances in UEFA Europa League)	0	—		32	10
Real Sociedad	2015–16	La Liga	35	5	1	0	—		—		—		36	5
Real Sociedad	2016–17	La Liga	35	9	4	1	—		—		—		39	10
Real Sociedad	2017–18	La Liga	13	1	2	0	—		2	0	—		17	1
Real Sociedad	Total		184	54	17	4	—		12	3	—		213	61
Los Angeles FC	2018	MLS	28	14	2	1	1	0	—		—		31	15
Los Angeles FC	2019	MLS	31	34	3	2	2	2	—		—		36	38
Los Angeles FC	2020	MLS	7	4	—		1	0	5 (Note: Appearances in CONCACAF Champions League)	5	—		13	9
Los Angeles FC	2021	MLS	20	5	—		—		—		—		20	5
Los Angeles FC	2022	MLS	32	12	3	0	3	0	—		—		38	12
Los Angeles FC	2023	MLS	34	9	0	0	5	0	8	3	2 (Note: One appearance and two goals in Leagues Cup, one appearance in Campeones Cup)	2	49	14
Los Angeles FC	2024	MLS	0	0	—		1	0	—		—		1	0
Los Angeles FC	Total		152	78	8	3	12	2	13	8	2	2	187	93
Career total			472	160	37	8	22	7	42	13	2	2	575	190

=== International ===
Appearances and goals by national team and year
National team	Year	Apps	Goals
Mexico	2007	2	1
Mexico	2008	11	3
Mexico	2009	9	3
Mexico	2010	11	2
Mexico	2011	2	0
Mexico	2012	—	
Mexico	2013	—	
Mexico	2014	2	2
Mexico	2015	11	4
Mexico	2016	1	0
Mexico	2017	15	3
Mexico	2018	8	1
Total		72	19

Scores and results list Mexico's goal tally first, score column indicates score after each Vela goal.

List of international goals scored by Carlos Vela
No.	Date	Venue	Opponent	Score	Result	Competition
1	16 October 2007	Los Angeles Memorial Coliseum, Los Angeles, United States	Guatemala	1–1	2–3	Friendly
2	8 June 2008	Soldier Field, Chicago, United States	Peru	3–0	4–0	Friendly
3	15 June 2008	Reliant Stadium, Houston, United States	Belize	1–0	2–0	2010 FIFA World Cup qualification
4	21 June 2008	Estadio Universitario, San Nicolás de los Garza, Mexico	Belize	1–0	7–0	2010 FIFA World Cup qualification
5	23 June 2009	Georgia Dome, Atlanta, United States	Venezuela	1–0	4–0	Friendly
6	26 July 2009	Giants Stadium, East Rutherford, United States	United States	3–0	5–0	2009 CONCACAF Gold Cup
7	10 October 2009	Estadio Azteca, Mexico City, Mexico	El Salvador	4–1	4–1	2010 FIFA World Cup qualification
8	3 March 2010	Rose Bowl, Pasadena, United States	New Zealand	2–0	2–0	Friendly
9	3 June 2010	Stade Roi Baudouin, Brussels, Belgium	Italy	1–0	2–1	Friendly
10	12 November 2014	Amsterdam ArenA, Amsterdam, Netherlands	Netherlands	1–0	3–2	Friendly
11	12 November 2014	Amsterdam ArenA, Amsterdam, Netherlands	Netherlands	2–1	3–2	Friendly
12	9 July 2015	Soldier Field, Chicago, United States	Cuba	2–0	6–0	2015 CONCACAF Gold Cup
13	15 July 2015	Bank of America Stadium, Charlotte, United States	Trinidad and Tobago	2–0	4–4	2015 CONCACAF Gold Cup
14	13 October 2015	Estadio Nemesio Díez, Toluca, Mexico	Panama	1–0	1–0	Friendly
15	13 November 2015	Estadio Azteca, Mexico City, Mexico	El Salvador	3–0	3–0	2018 FIFA World Cup qualification
16	1 June 2017	MetLife Stadium, East Rutherford, United States	Republic of Ireland	3–0	3–1	Friendly
17	11 June 2017	Estadio Azteca, Mexico City, Mexico	United States	1–1	1–1	2018 FIFA World Cup qualification
18	10 October 2017	Estadio Olímpico Metropolitano, San Pedro Sula, Honduras	Honduras	2–1	2–3	2018 FIFA World Cup qualification
19	23 June 2018	Rostov Arena, Rostov-on-Don, Russia	South Korea	1–0	2–1	2018 FIFA World Cup

== Honours ==
Los Angeles FC

- MLS Cup: 2022
- Supporters' Shield: 2019, 2022
- U.S. Open Cup: 2024

Mexico U17

- FIFA U-17 World Championship: 2005

Mexico

- CONCACAF Gold Cup: 2009, 2015
- CONCACAF Cup: 2015

Individual

- FIFA U-17 World Championship Golden Boot: 2005
- Real Sociedad Player of the Year: 2011–12, 2013–14
- La Liga Player of the Month: December 2013, November 2014
- MLS All-Star: 2018, 2019, 2022
- MLS Best XI: 2018, 2019, 2022
- MLS Player of the Month: March 2019, April 2019, September 2019
- MLS Golden Boot: 2019
- MLS MVP Award: 2019
- Los Angeles FC MVP of the Year: 2018
- Los Angeles FC Goal of the Year: 2018
- Los Angeles FC Goal of the Month: April 2018, May 2023
- CONCACAF Champions League Team of the Tournament: 2020, 2023
- MLS Latino Player of the Year: 2019
- Best MLS Player ESPY: 2022
- The Best of America Best MLS Player: 2019, 2022
