= 2019 South American Footballer of the Year =

Award given by Uruguayan newspaper

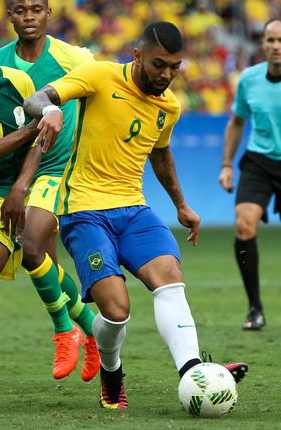
Gabriel Barbosa, 2019 South American Footballer of the Year

The 2019 South American Footballer of the Year award (Spanish: Rey del Fútbol de América), given to the best football player in South America by Uruguayan newspaper El País through voting by journalists across the continent, was awarded to Brazilian striker Gabriel Barbosa of Flamengo on December 31, 2019.

The award is part of the paper's "El Mejor de América" (The Best of America) awards, which also presents the awards for South American Coach of the Year (Entrenador del año en Sudamérica) and the Best XI (Equipo Ideal), composed of the best eleven players at their positions. Marcelo Gallardo of River Plate was named Coach of the Year for the second consecutive year.

== Best Player ==
Rank	Player	Nationality	Club	Votes
1	Gabriel Barbosa	Brazil	(Brazil) Flamengo	168
2	Bruno Henrique	Brazil	(Brazil) Flamengo	83
3	Giorgian De Arrascaeta	Uruguay	(Brazil) Flamengo	40
4	Ignacio Fernández	Argentina	(Argentina) River Plate	25
5	Enzo Pérez	Argentina	(Argentina) River Plate	21
6	Everton	Brazil	(Brazil) Grêmio	9
7	Roque Santa Cruz	Paraguay	(Paraguay) Olimpia	5
8	Nicolás De La Cruz	Uruguay	(Argentina) River Plate	4
9	Rafael Santos Borré	Colombia	(Argentina) River Plate	3
10	Dani Alves	Brazil	(Brazil) São Paulo^{1}	2
10	Yeferson Soteldo	Venezuela	(Brazil) Santos	2
12	Filipe Luís	Brazil	(Brazil) Flamengo^{2}	1
12	Franco Armani	Argentina	(Argentina) River Plate	1
12	Carlos Vela	Mexico	(United States) Los Angeles FC	1
12	Paolo Guerrero	Peru	(Brazil) Internacional	1
12	Jorge Pinos	Ecuador	(Ecuador) Independiente del Valle	1
12	Germán Cano	Argentina	(Colombia) Independiente Medellín	1
12	Rodolfo Pizarro	Mexico	(Mexico) Monterrey	1
12	Juan Fernando Quintero	Colombia	(Argentina) River Plate	1

^{1}Dani Alves played part of 2019 with Paris Saint-Germain (France).

^{2}Filipe Luís played part of 2019 with Atlético Madrid (Spain).

== Best Manager ==
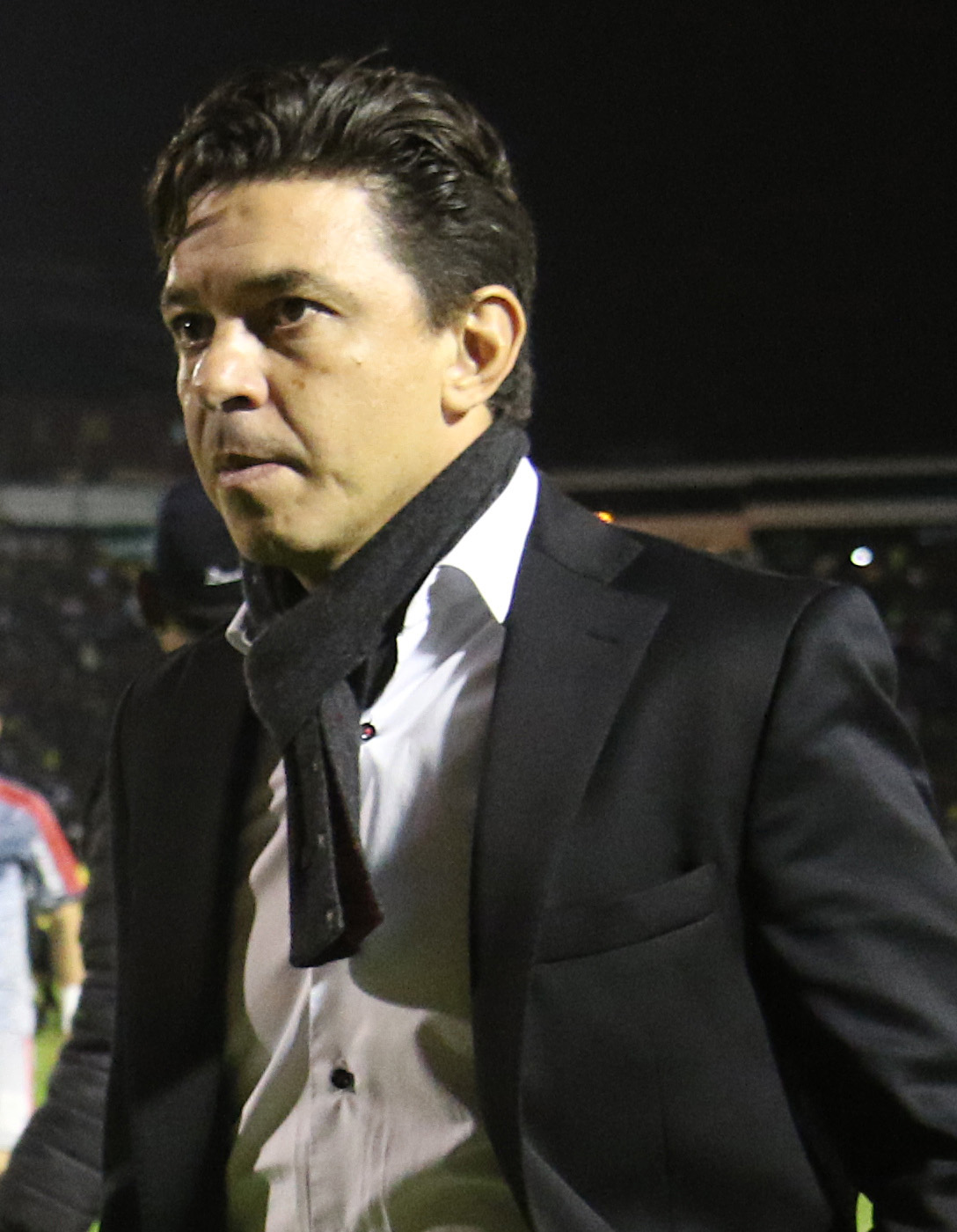
Marcelo Gallardo, 2019 South American Coach of the Year

Rank	Player	Nationality	Club / National team	Votes
1	Marcelo Gallardo	Argentina	(Argentina) River Plate	216
2	Jorge Jesus	Portugal	(Brazil) Flamengo^{1}	133
3	Miguel Ángel Ramírez	Spain	(Ecuador) Independiente del Valle	7
4	Tite	Brazil	Brazil national team	6
5	Ricardo Gareca	Argentina	Peru national team	5
6	Óscar Tabárez	Uruguay	Uruguay national team	2
7	Gustavo Quinteros	Bolivia	(Chile) Universidad Católica	1
7	Alexandre Guimarães	Brazil^{2}	(Colombia) América de Cali	1
7	Miguel Herrera	Mexico	(Mexico) Club América	1

^{1}Jorge Jesus spent part of 2019 as manager of Al Hilal (Saudi Arabia). ^{2}Alexandre Guimarães has Costa Rican dual-citizenship.

== Best Team ==

2019 South American Best Team

Position	Player	Nationality	Club
GK	Franco Armani	Argentina	(Argentina) River Plate
LB	Filipe Luís	Brazil	(Brazil) Flamengo^{1}
CB	Javier Pinola	Argentina	(Argentina) River Plate
CB	Rodrigo Caio	Brazil	(Brazil) Flamengo
RB	Rafinha	Brazil	(Brazil) Flamengo^{2}
MF	Ignacio Fernández	Argentina	(Argentina) River Plate
MF	Giorgian De Arrascaeta	Uruguay	(Brazil) Flamengo
MF	Enzo Pérez	Argentina	(Argentina) River Plate
FW	Bruno Henrique	Brazil	(Brazil) Flamengo
FW	Gabriel Barbosa	Brazil	(Brazil) Flamengo
FW	Everton	Brazil	(Brazil) Grêmio

^{1}Filipe Luís played part of 2019 with Atlético Madrid (Spain). ^{2}Rafinha played part of 2019 with Bayern Munich (Germany).

== National awards ==
Nation	Best player	Best manager	Best team
Argentina	(Argentina) Enzo Pérez (River Plate)	(Argentina) Marcelo Gallardo (River Plate)	River Plate
Bolivia	(Bolivia) Juan Carlos Arce (Bolívar)	(Bolivia) Erwin Sánchez (Club Blooming)	Bolívar
Brazil	(Brazil) Bruno Henrique (Flamengo)	(Portugal) Jorge Jesus (Flamengo)^{1}	Flamengo
Chile	(Chile) José Pedro Fuenzalida (U. Católica)	(Argentina) Gustavo Quinteros^{2} (U. Católica)	Universidad Católica
Colombia	(Colombia) Teó Gutiérrez (Junior)	(Uruguay) Julio Comesaña (Junior)	Junior
Ecuador	(Ecuador) Michael Estrada (Macará)	(Ecuador) Paúl Vélez (Macará)	Macará
United States	(Mexico) Carlos Vela (Los Angeles FC)	(United States) Brian Schmetzer (Seattle Sounders FC)	Los Angeles FC
Honduras	(Honduras) Juan Ramón Mejía (Real de Minas)	(Argentina) Pedro Troglio (Olimpia)	Olimpia
Mexico	(Argentina) Guido Rodríguez (América)	(Mexico) Miguel Herrera (América)	León
Paraguay	(Paraguay) Roque Santa Cruz (Club Olimpia)	(Argentina) Daniel Garnero (Club Olimpia)	Club Olimpia
Peru	(Peru) Kevin Quevedo (Alianza Lima)	(Uruguay) Pablo Bengoechea (Alianza Lima)	Binacional
Uruguay	(Uruguay) Matías Viña (Nacional)	(Uruguay) Danielo Núñez (Cerro Largo)	Cerro Largo
Venezuela	(Venezuela) Rubert Quijada (Caracas)	(Venezuela) Noel Sanvicente (Caracas)	Caracas

^{1}Jorge Jesus spent part of 2019 as manager of Al Hilal (Saudi Arabia). ^{2}Gustavo Quinteros has Bolivian dual-citizenship.
