= Xinguara Municipal Airport =

Airport in Pará, Brazil

Xinguara Airport Aeroporto de Xingara
- IATA: XIG; ICAO: SWSX; LID: PA0150

Summary
- Airport type: Private
- Serves: Xinguara
- Time zone: BRT (UTC−03:00)
- Elevation AMSL: 247 m / 810 ft
- Coordinates: 07°05′26″S 049°58′35″W

Map
- Location of the airport in Brazil XIG (Brazil)

Runways
| Direction | Length | | Surface |
| Direction | m | ft | Surface |
|---|---|---|---|
| 13/31 | 950 | 3,117 | Dirt |
- Sources: ANAC, DECEA

Xinguara Airport (IATA: XIG, ICAO: SWSX) is an airport serving Xinguara, Brazil.

== Airlines and destinations ==
No scheduled flights operate at this airport.

== Access ==
The airport is located 5 km (3 mi) westward from downtown Xinguara.

== See also ==
- List of airports in Brazil
