= Álex dos Santos =

Brazilian footballer

Personal information
- Full name: Alexandre dos Santos Ferreira
- Date of birth: 15 January 1999 (age 27)
- Place of birth: Xinguara, Brazil
- Height: 1.85 m (6 ft 1 in)
- Position: Goalkeeper

Youth career
- Don Benito Balompié
- 2011–2018: Atlético Madrid

Senior career*
Years	Team	Apps	(Gls)
2018–2020	Atlético Madrid B	20	(0)
2020–2021	Lokomotiva	2	(0)
2021	Getafe B	14	(0)
2021–2022	Toledo	6	(0)
2022–2023	Móstoles	14	(0)
2024	Montijo	14	(0)
- * Club domestic league appearances and goals as of 5 May 2024

Alexandre "Álex" dos Santos Ferreira (born 15 January 1999) is a Brazilian footballer who plays as a goalkeeper.

== Club career ==
=== Atlético Madrid ===
Born in Xinguara, Pará, dos Santos was raised in Extremadura, and joined Atlético Madrid's youth setup in 2011, from Don Benito Balompié AD. On 21 August 2013, while still a youth, he signed a new five-year contract with the club.

Promoted to the reserves for the 2018–19 season, dos Santos made his senior debut on 23 September 2018, starting in a 4–2 Segunda División B away win against CDA Navalcarnero. The following 8 February, he extended his contract until 2022, but spent most of the campaign as a backup to Miguel San Román.

dos Santos became a regular starter in 2019–20 after San Román left, but the season was curtailed due to the COVID-19 pandemic.

=== Lokomotiva ===
On 20 August 2020, dos Santos moved to Croatian side NK Lokomotiva as a part of Ivo Grbić's transfer to Atlético; his former side also retained 40% over a future sale. He made his professional debut on 13 September, playing the full 90 minutes of a 1–2 home loss against HNK Gorica for the Croatian First Football League championship.

== Honours ==
Atlético Madrid

- UEFA Super Cup: 2018

== Personal life ==
Born in Brazil, dos Santos also holds Spanish nationality.
