= Xinguara =

Coordinates: 7.095°S 49.9458°W

- Municipality
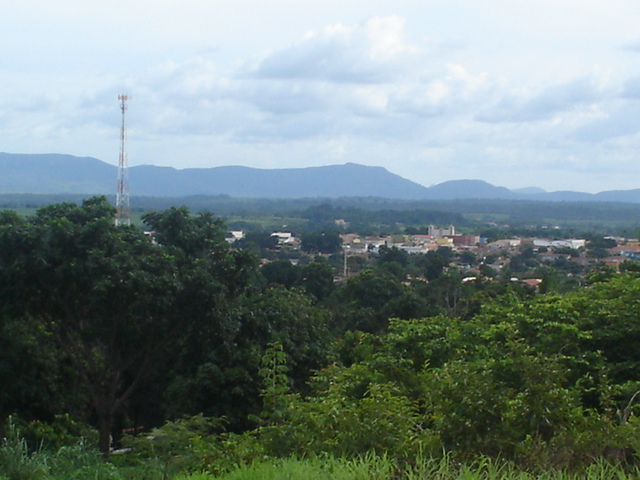
- Xinguara, view from the "Morro das Torres"

- Flag
- Interactive map of Xinguara
- Country: Brazil
- Region: Northern
- State: Pará
- Mesoregion: Sudeste Paraense

Population (2020)
  - Total: 45,086
- Time zone: UTC−3 (BRT)

Xinguara is a municipality in the state of Pará in the Northern region of Brazil.

== Transportation ==
The locality is served by the Xinguara Municipal Airport (IATA: XIG).

== See also ==
- List of municipalities in Pará
