= Miguel Herrera =

Mexican footballer and manager (born 1968)

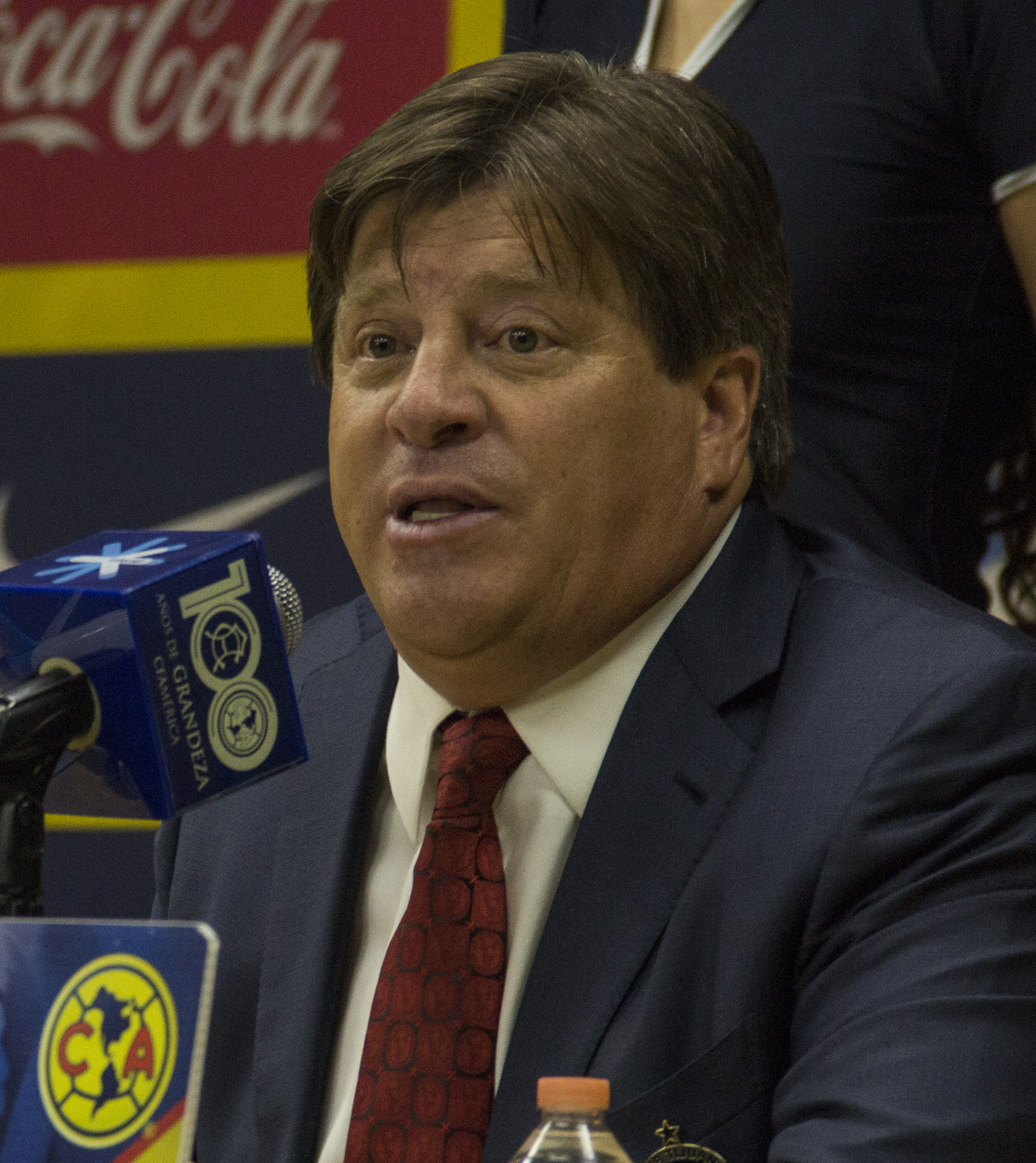
- Herrera as Tijuana manager in 2016

Personal information
- Full name: Miguel Ernesto Herrera Aguirre
- Date of birth: 18 March 1968 (age 58)
- Place of birth: Cuautepec, Hidalgo, Mexico
- Height: 1.70 m (5 ft 7 in)
- Position: Defender

Team information
- Current team: Atlante (head coach)

Senior career*
Years	Team	Apps	(Gls)
1985–1986	Deportivo Neza	?	(?)
1987–1988	UAG	?	(?)
1988–1989	Santos Laguna	30	(4)
1989–1990	Atlante	36	(4)
1990–1991	Querétaro	30	(2)
1991–1995	Atlante	125	(9)
1995–1999	Toros Neza	109	(2)
1999–2000	Atlante	33	(0)
Total		380	(21)

International career
1993–1994	Mexico	14	(0)

Managerial career
- 2002–2004: Atlante
- 2004–2007: Monterrey
- 2008: Veracruz
- 2008–2010: Estudiantes Tecos
- 2010–2011: Atlante
- 2011–2013: América
- 2013–2015: Mexico
- 2015–2017: Tijuana
- 2017–2020: América
- 2021–2022: Tigres UANL
- 2023–2024: Tijuana
- 2025: Costa Rica
- 2026–: Atlante
Medal record
Men's football
Representing Mexico (as a player)
Copa América
Runner-up	1993 Ecuador	Team
Representing Mexico (as manager)
CONCACAF Gold Cup
Winner	2015 United States-Canada
- * Club domestic league appearances and goals

Miguel Ernesto Herrera Aguirre (born in Cuautepec, Hidalgo; March 18, 1968), popularly referred to by his nickname "Piojo" (Spanish for "louse"), is a Mexican professional football manager and former player. He is the current head coach of Liga MX club Atlante.

As a player, Herrera represented six different clubs in Mexican football. He is primarily remembered for his time at Atlante, where he won a Primera División title, and Toros Neza, where he accumulated more than 100 appearances. On the international stage, he earned 14 caps for the Mexico national team and took part in the 1993 Copa América, where Mexico finished as runners-up.

As a manager, Herrera has led seven clubs in Mexico's top division, most notably Club América. Across two separate spells with the team, he guided them to two league championships. On the international stage, he managed Mexico at the 2014 FIFA World Cup, and later took charge of Costa Rica's national team.

== Club career ==
Herrera made his debut in 1985 with Segunda División side Deportivo Neza. Originally a forward, he switched to playing as a defender after his move to Tecos UAG in 1987. Herrera made his debut in the Primera División on May 22, 1988, in a 2–0 victory over Atlas. He was transferred to Santos Laguna in 1988, making 30 appearances and scoring four goals. He had his first stint with Atlante in 1989, making 36 appearances and scoring four goals before moving to Querétaro in 1990. He again transferred to Atlante in 1991, and won his first league title during the 1992–93 season after defeating Monterrey in the finals by a 4–0 aggregate score after winning the first-leg 1–0 and the second 4–0. He would remain at the club until 1995, making 125 appearances and scoring nine goals. Herrera was then sold to Toros Neza, with whom he would play in his second league final during the "Verano '97" season, ultimately losing to Guadalajara by an aggregate score of 7–2. In 1999, Herrera returned to Atlante for a third time before officially retiring in 2000.

== International career ==
Herrera participated with Mexico's national team in the 1993 Copa América tournament held in Ecuador. Mexico went on to reach the final against Argentina, losing 1–2.

Herrera played in all of Mexico's matches during the qualifying stages for the 1994 FIFA World Cup, though he was omitted from the final squad list by coach Miguel Mejía Barón.

== Managerial career ==
=== First spell with Atlante ===
In 2002, two years after retiring, Herrera came back to coach his former club Atlante. He would remain manager for two years, but resigned in 2004 after failing to take Atlante to a final.

=== Monterrey ===
For the Apertura 2004, Herrera was named head coach of Monterrey. He coincidentally faced his former club Atlante in the semifinals, with Monterrey advancing by an aggregate score of 7–3. He ultimately failed to make Monterrey champions, losing to UNAM in the final by an aggregate score of 3–1. He succeeded in taking Monterrey to another final in the Apertura 2005 tournament, but failed once more, this time losing to Toluca with an aggregate score of 6–3. Herrera would continue to be manager of Monterrey until the Apertura 2007 tournament, where his contract was terminated in September 2007 due to continuous poor form.

=== Veracruz ===
Prior to the Clausura 2008, Herrera was hired as manager of Tiburones Rojos de Veracruz after the resignation of Antonio Mohamed. A stand-out victory for Herrera was a 4–0 home victory over Club América on March 29, 2008. He was in charge of preventing Veracruz from being relegated to the Primera División 'A' de México, though Veracruz was inevitably relegated to the level. Herrera parted ways with the club in May 2008.

=== Estudiantes Tecos ===
Shortly after leaving Veracruz, Herrera was hired to manage a struggling Estudiantes Tecos midway into the Apertura 2008 tournament to replace José Luis Trejo. He was fired on September 6, 2010 after Tecos suffered a 0–3 defeat against Guadalajara during a league match of the Apertura tournament.

=== Second spell with Atlante ===
In November 2010, it was announced that Herrera was hired as the new Atlante manager, returning to his former club following his first managerial stint in 2002. Under his reign, Atlante finished in fourth place in the Clausura 2011, though they would be eliminated in the quarterfinals by Cruz Azul. Atlante failed to qualify for the playoffs of the Apertura 2011, and Herrera did not renew his contract with the club. There were reports linking him with Club América as their new manager for the following season.

=== América ===
On November 16, 2011, Herrera was officially named the new manager of Club América. In his first press conference, Herrera revealed he had signed a six-month contract, saying, "[i]f in six months I don't give results, I'll leave." On January 7, 2012, América defeated Querétaro 2–0, which was Herrera's first official victory with América. América finished the Clausura in third place and reached the semifinals, being eliminated by Monterrey by an aggregate score of 0–2. On May 14, Miguel Herrera was ratified as manager. He led the club to a fourth-place finish the following Apertura, once again being eliminated at the semifinals stage following a 2–3 aggregate loss to Toluca.

On May 26, 2013, América won the eleventh league title in its history by defeating Cruz Azul 4–2 on penalties after a dramatic comeback from a 0–1 first leg loss to tie 2–2 on aggregate, and playing the second leg with ten men for over 105 minutes. It was Herrera's first title in his managerial career after losing his two previous finals while at Monterrey.

The following Apertura, Herrera led América to another league final after topping the league table with 37 points, however they were defeated by León. Midway through the tournament, Herrera was named interim coach of Mexico's national team; his assistant Álvaro Galindo coached América until Herrera's return in November. It was later announced that Herrera would take over as head coach of the Mexican team on a permanent basis.

=== Mexico national team ===
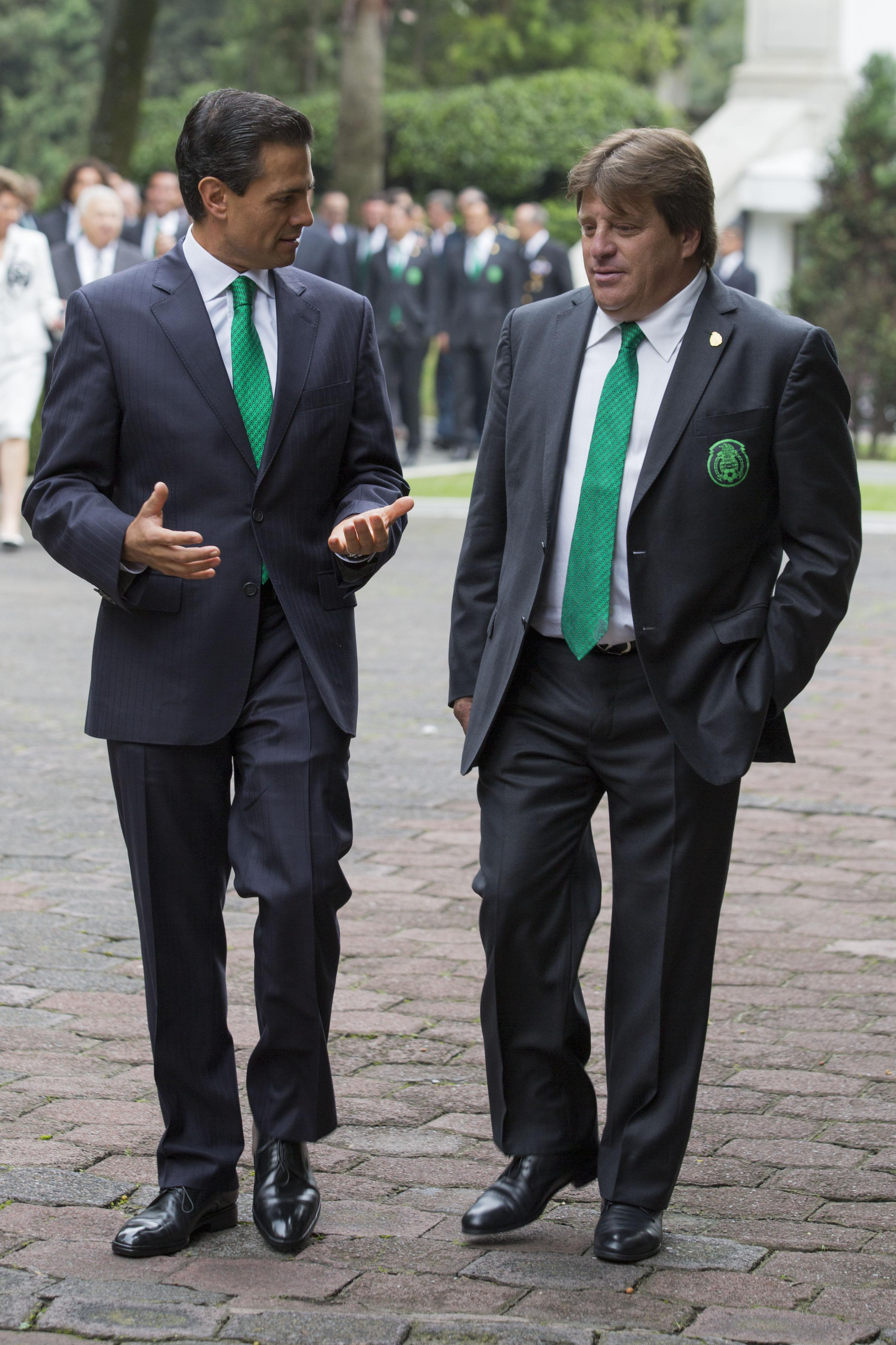
Herrera with former Mexican President Enrique Peña Nieto in 2014.

On October 18, 2013, Herrera was appointed interim head coach of Mexico, replacing Víctor Manuel Vucetich to become the fourth national team coach within the span of a month. He led El Tri to a 9–3 aggregate victory over New Zealand in the inter-confederation play-off to qualify for the 2014 World Cup in Brazil. On December 2, it was announced that Herrera would remain national team coach at least through the World Cup.

At the World Cup, Mexico finished in second place in their group with 7 points, obtaining wins against Cameroon and Croatia and securing a scoreless draw against the host nation. They faced the Netherlands in the round-of-16, where Mexico was controversially eliminated after succumbing to a 2–1 defeat. On December 3, he declared that his contract with the national team was renewed. His performances for 2014 had the IFFHS rank him as the 7th best manager of the year.

Mexico failed to make it past the group stage of the 2015 Copa América, only attaining two draws and one loss and no victories. On July 26, 2015, Mexico won the CONCACAF Gold Cup after defeating Jamaica 3–1 in the final. Two days later, Herrera was released as coach of the Mexico national team after an alleged physical altercation with TV Azteca announcer Christian Martinoli – who had been critical of Herrera – while the two waited in the TSA line at the Philadelphia International Airport.

=== Tijuana ===
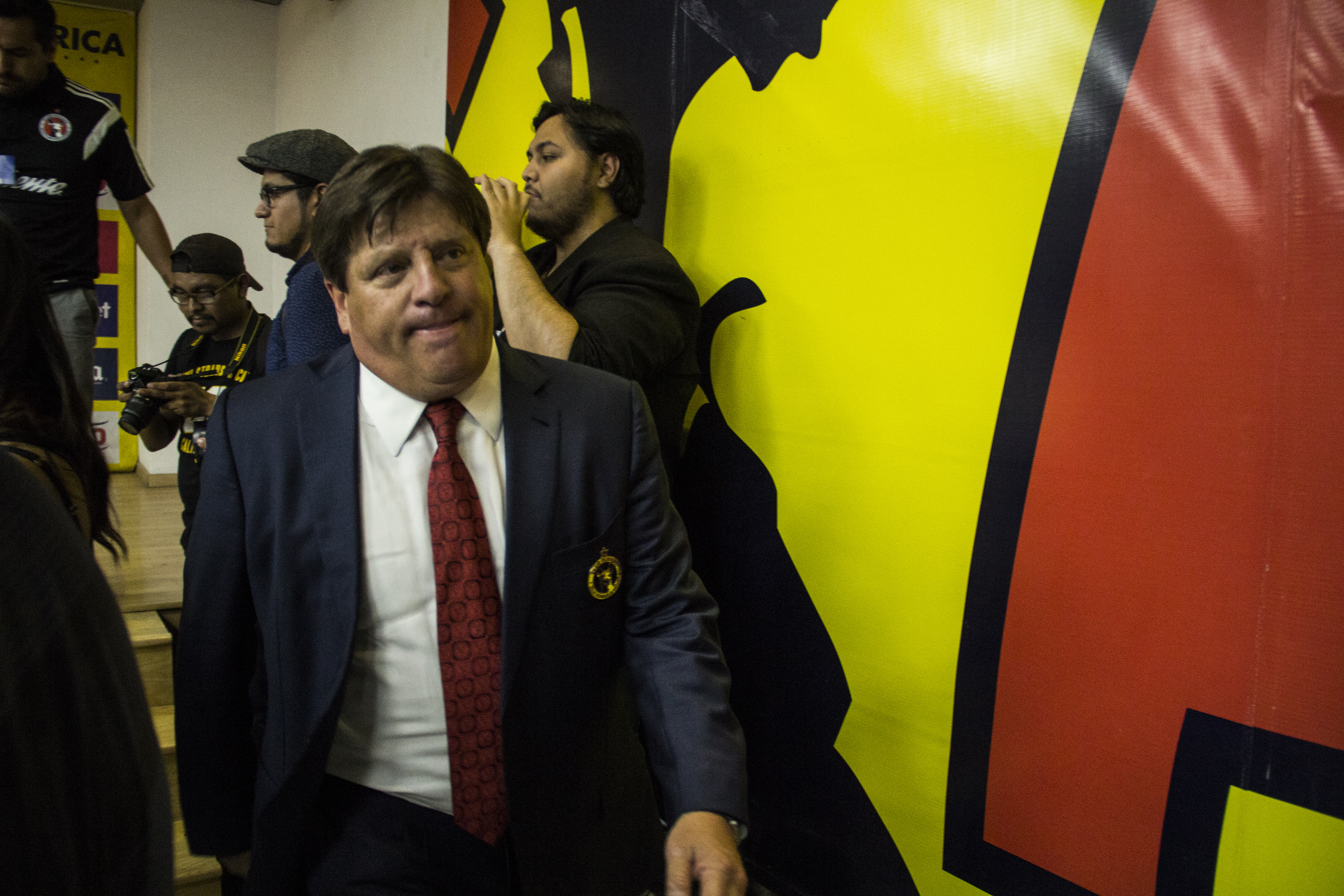
Herrera as Tijuana manager in 2016

On November 2, 2015, Herrera was named as the new manager of Club Tijuana. He managed the club until May 2017, qualifying to the play-offs twice.

=== Return to América ===
On May 26, 2017, Club América announced Herrera as their new manager. He lost in his first official game as the club's manager, a 1–2 defeat to Querétaro in the Supercopa MX. Six days later, América lost to Querétaro again, this time by a 0–1 scoreline, in their opening match of the Apertura tournament. The following week, Herrera won his first league match in his second spell with América, defeating Pachuca 2–0 at the Estadio Hidalgo. Herrera led América to a third-place finish during the regular phase of the Apertura, however they were eliminated in the semifinals by Tigres UANL. América also went out of the 2018 CONCACAF Champions League to Toronto FC in the semifinals. The club finished the following Clausura tournament in second-place, and was again eliminated at the semifinal stage, this time losing to Santos Laguna by a 6–3 aggregate score.

Herrera led América to another second-place finish in the 2018 Apertura, only suffering two defeats throughout the regular phase of the tournament, and went undefeated in the playoffs. On December 16, Herrera won his second league title – both with Club América – following a 2–0 aggregate victory over Cruz Azul in the finals. He also led the team on a 17-game unbeaten streak en route to winning the championship, equaling the record set by the club under Mario Carrillo in 2005 when it won that year's Clausura.

On February 5, 2019, Herrera reached 100 wins in charge of Club América following a 3–1 victory over Necaxa in the Copa MX, becoming the third manager in the club's history after Jose Antonio Roca and Carlos Reinoso to reach that milestone. On April 11, América defeated Juárez 1–0 in the Clausura final of the Copa MX. This was Herrera's first cup title in his career, and his third title overall with Club América.

On December 21, 2020, Herrera was dismissed from his position following the club's exit from the CONCACAF Champions League.

=== Tigres UANL ===
On May 20, 2021, Herrera was appointed as the new manager of Tigres UANL, replacing Ricardo Ferretti. On 9 November 2022, Herrera was dismissed from his job.

=== Return to Tijuana ===
On February 10, 2023, Club Tijuana announced Herrera as their new manager. On April 30, 2024, Tijuana and Herrera parted ways.

=== Costa Rica ===
On January 7, 2025, the Costa Rican Football Federation announced Herrera as the new manager of Costa Rica's national team. On November 20, 2025, Herrera was dismissed from his role following Costa Rica's failure to qualify for the 2026 FIFA World Cup.

=== Third spell with Atlante ===
On April 28, 2026, Herrera was appointed head coach of Atlante once more, tasked with guiding the club in their return to the top flight.

== Managerial style ==
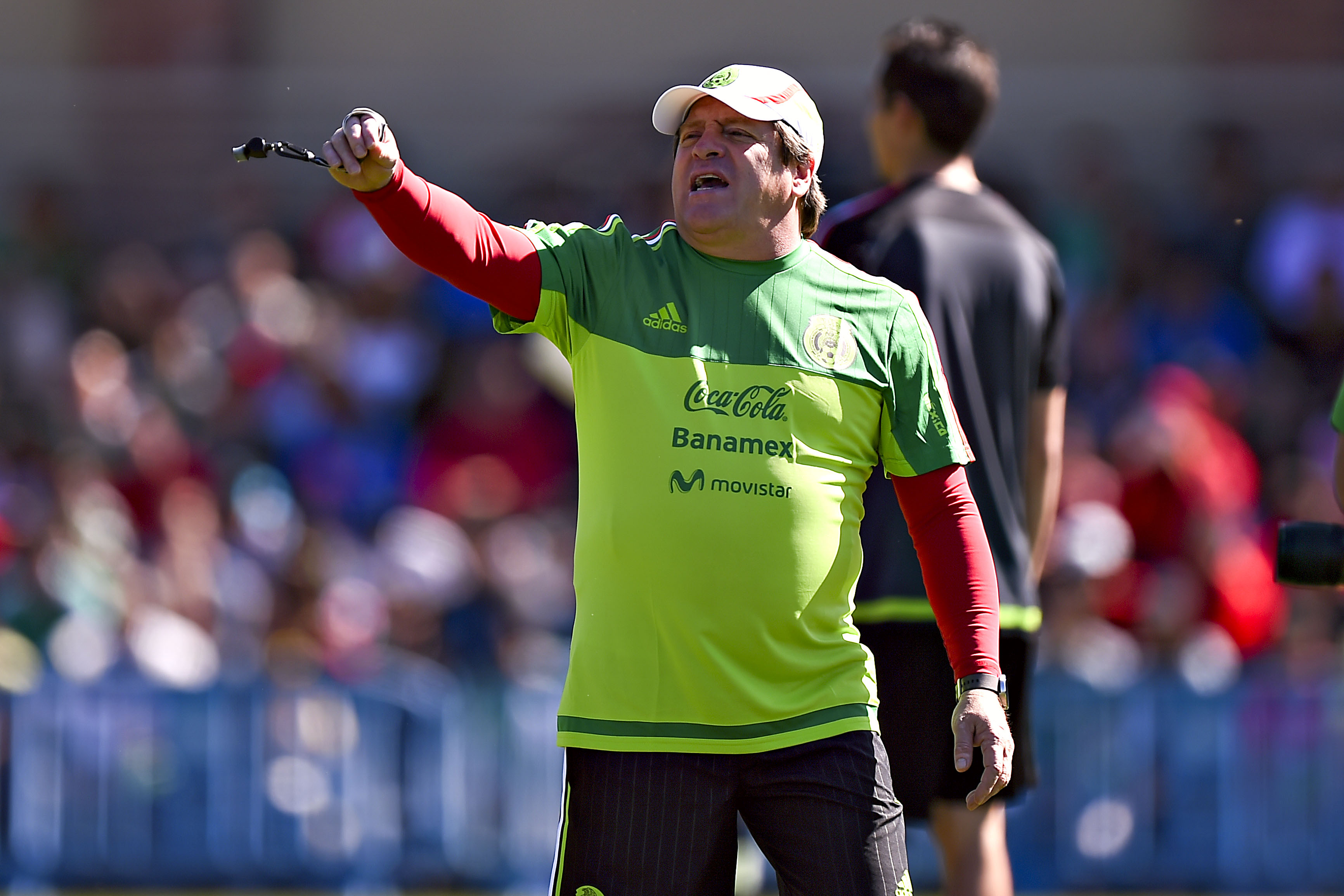
Herrera coaching Mexico in 2015

Herrera is a known "Lavolpista", a term used to describe coaches that follow the style and philosophy of Ricardo La Volpe, although Herrera has stated he isn't, arguing he incorporates footballing styles from various other coaches he has trained with. Most of them use the 5–3–2 formation with fast wing-backs. Herrera has been criticized for deploying a "pyrotechnic" style with offensive and direct game that sometimes leaves the defense vulnerable. He transferred over the formation from Club América to national level when he was made Mexico's manager.

== Managerial statistics ==
As of November 20, 2026

Team	Nat	From	To	Record				
Team	Nat	From	To	G	W	D	L	Win %
Atlante	(Mexico)	February 20, 2002	May 30, 2004	97	38	31	28	39.18
Monterrey	(Mexico)	June 2, 2004	September 26, 2007	127	51	32	44	40.16
Veracruz	(Mexico)	January 30, 2008	May 3, 2008	15	4	5	6	26.67
Estudiantes Tecos	(Mexico)	September 2, 2008	September 6, 2010	80	25	21	34	31.25
Atlante	(Mexico)	November 23, 2010	November 15, 2011	36	13	8	15	36.11
América	(Mexico)	November 16, 2011	December 15, 2013	102	55	23	24	53.92
Mexico	(Mexico)	October 18, 2013	July 28, 2015	36	19	10	7	52.78
Tijuana	(Mexico)	November 2, 2015	May 21, 2017	74	33	18	23	44.59
América	(Mexico)	May 30, 2017	December 21, 2020	175	87	43	45	49.71
Tigres UANL	(Mexico)	May 20, 2021	November 9, 2022	63	32	13	18	50.79
Tijuana	(Mexico)	February 10, 2023	April 30, 2024	47	10	13	24	21.28
Costa Rica	(Costa Rica)	January 7, 2025	November 20, 2025	15	7	6	2	46.67
Atlante	(Mexico)	April 28, 2026	Present	20	4	5	11	20.00
Total				887	378	228	281	42.62

== Honours ==
=== Player ===
Atlante

- Mexican Primera División: 1992–93

Mexico

- Copa América runner-up: 1993

=== Manager ===
América

- Liga MX: Clausura 2013, Apertura 2018
- Copa MX: Clausura 2019
- Campeón de Campeones: 2019

Mexico

- CONCACAF Gold Cup: 2015

Individual

- Mexican Primera División Best Manager: Apertura 2002
- CONCACAF Men's Best Coach of the Year: 2013 (second), 2015 (third)
- The Best of America Best Liga MX Manager: 2019
