= 2022 Philadelphia Union II season =

Philadelphia Union II
2022 season
- Ownership Group: Keystone S&E
- Head coach: Marlon LeBlanc
- Stadium: Subaru Park
- MLS Next Pro: Eastern Conf.: 3rd Overall: 15th
- MLS Next Pro Playoffs: Conference Semifinals
- Average home league attendance: 467
- Biggest win: PHI 2–0 CIN (3/26); ORL 1–3 PHI (7/24)
- Biggest defeat: PHI 0–5 NYCFC (6/27)
Home colors	Away colors

The 2022 Philadelphia Union II season was the club's sixth competitive season and first season competing in the inaugural MLS Next Pro. Union II competes in the MLS Next Pro's Eastern Conference. The team is managed by Marlon LeBlanc, his first competitive season with the club.

== Background ==
After taking a competitive hiatus during the 2021 season, by December 2021 Union II was announced as one of the founding clubs of MLS Next Pro. Marlon LeBlanc, who was appointed head coach of Union II in March 2021, would now have his first competitive season with the team. In April 2022, Jose Kleberson was announced as an assistant coach under LeBlanc, after several years coaching in the Union's youth academy system.

Union II's roster construction began with their inaugural signing, Nelson Pierre from the Union academy system. Largely supplemented with first team and academy players, the front office made a marquee signing with José Riasco, paying a reported transfer fee over $1 million.

== 2022 Roster ==
As of February 14, 2022

Note: Flags indicate national team as defined under FIFA eligibility rules; some limited exceptions apply. Players may hold more than one non-FIFA nationality.

No.	Pos.	Nation	Player
1	GK	USA	Matt Freese (HGP)
2	DF	USA	Matthew Real (HGP)
13	MF	USA	Cole Turner (HGP)
16	MF	USA	Jack McGlynn (HGP)
20	MF	VEN	Jesús Bueno
21	FW	USA	Nelson Pierre
22	GK	USA	Brooks Thompson
24	DF	USA	Anton Sorenson (HGP)
30	MF	USA	Paxten Aaronson (HGP)
32	FW	VEN	José Riasco
34	DF	USA	Brandon Craig (HGP)
36	MF	USA	Ian Abbey

No.	Pos.	Nation	Player
37	MF	COL	Carlos Paternina
38	MF	VEN	Maike Villero
39	DF	USA	Francis Westfield
40	FW	USA	Chris Donovan
42	DF	USA	Jack Jasinski
44	DF	USA	Jackson Gilman
50	MF	VEN	Juan Perdomo
52	MF	SEN	Boubacar Diallo
55	MF	USA	Bajung Darboe
75	DF	VEN	Nathan Nkanji
98	FW	USA	Stefan Stojanovic
99	GK	USA	Damián Alguera

Signed to first team contract with Philadelphia Union.
Philadelphia Union Academy player.

== Transfers ==
=== In ===
Date	Player	Number	Position	Previous club	Fee/notes
March 8, 2022	(United States) Nelson Pierre	21	FW	(United States) Philadelphia Union Academy	Signed
March 9, 2022	(United States) Stefan Stojanovic	98	FW	(United States) Georgetown Hoyas	Signed
March 9, 2022	(United States) Brooks Thompson	22	GK	(United States) Sporting Kansas City	Signed
March 9, 2022	(United States) Chris Donovan	40	FW	(United States) Drexel Dragons	Signed
March 9, 2022	(Venezuela) Juan Perdomo	50	MF	(Venezuela) Deportivo Lara	Signed
March 9, 2022	(Venezuela) Nathan Nkanji	75	DF	(United States) Florida Premier	Signed
March 9, 2022	(Venezuela) Maike Villero	38	MF	Atlético Venezuela C.F.	Signed
March 23, 2022	(Venezuela) José Riasco	32	FW	(Venezuela) Deportivo La Guaira F.C.	Signed, $1 million transfer fee
March 24, 2022	(Colombia) Carlos Panternina	37	MF	(Colombia) Envigado F.C.	Signed

== Competitions ==
Eastern Conference

Pos	Div	Team	Pld	W	SOW	SOL	L	GF	GA	GD	Pts	Qualification
1	CT	Columbus Crew 2	24	16	2	3	3	62	22	+40	55	Qualification for the 2022 MLS Next Pro Playoffs
2	NE	Toronto FC II	24	12	2	1	9	44	38	+6	41	Qualification for the 2022 MLS Next Pro Playoffs
3	NE	Philadelphia Union II	24	11	3	1	9	42	39	+3	40	Qualification for the 2022 MLS Next Pro Playoffs
4	NE	Rochester New York FC	24	10	4	2	8	37	30	+7	40	Qualification for the 2022 MLS Next Pro Playoffs
5	NE	New York City FC II	24	9	4	2	9	49	35	+14	37	

Source: MLSNP Eastern Conference
Rules for classification: 1) points; 2) total wins; 3) total goal differential; 4) total goals scored; 5) fewer disciplinary points; 6) away goal differential; 7) away goals scored; 8) home goals differential; 9) home goals scored; 10) coin toss (2 clubs tied) or drawing of lots (≥3 clubs tied)

Overall table

Pos	Team	Pld	W	SOW	SOL	L	GF	GA	GD	Pts
6	San Jose Earthquakes II	24	12	1	3	8	48	37	+11	41
7	Toronto FC II	24	12	2	1	9	44	38	+6	41
8	Philadelphia Union II	24	11	3	1	9	42	39	+3	40
9	Rochester New York FC	24	10	4	2	8	37	30	+7	40
10	New York City FC II	24	9	4	2	9	49	35	+14	37

Source: MLSNP
Rules for classification: 1) points; 2) total wins; 3) total goal differential; 4) total goals scored; 5) fewer disciplinary points; 6) away goal differential; 7) away goals scored; 8) home goals differential; 9) home goals scored; 10) coin toss (2 clubs tied) or drawing of lots (≥3 clubs tied)

=== Results summary ===
Overall								Home						Away					
Pld	W	D	L	GF	GA	GD	Pts	W	D	L	GF	GA	GD	W	D	L	GF	GA	GD
24	11	4	9	42	39	+3	37	6	2	4	23	17	+6	5	2	5	19	22	−3

Last updated: September 18, 2022.
Source: MLS Next Pro

Per MLS Next Pro rules, 1 point is added for any penalty shootout won after a draw.

=== Regular season ===
March 27, 2022 1	Philadelphia Union II	2–0	FC Cincinnati 2	Chester, Pennsylvania
6:00 PM EDT	Paternina 4' (yellow card) 53'; Bueno 58'	Report	Marshall (yellow card) 46'	Stadium: Subaru Park; Referee: Thomas Snyder

April 5, 2022 2	Inter Miami II	3–3 (3–4 SO)	Philadelphia Union II	Fort Lauderdale, Florida
6:00 PM EDT	Mendez (yellow card) 63'; Cremaschi 74'; Borgelin 81', 90+4'	Report	Aaronson 45+2'; McGlynn 68' (pen.); Diallo 88'	Stadium: DRV PNK Stadium; Referee: Joshua Encarnación

April 10, 2022 3	Philadelphia Union II	0–1	Columbus Crew 2	Chester, Pennsylvania
5:00 PM EDT	Bueno (yellow card) 16'; Paternina (yellow card) 88'	Report	A. Morris (yellow card) 20'; Russell-Rowe 56'	Stadium: Subaru Park; Referee: Alyssa Nichols

April 24, 2022 4	Chicago Fire FC II	3–3 (5–4 SO)	Philadelphia Union II	Bridgeview, Illinois
7:00 PM CDT	M. Rodriguez (yellow card) 6'; Bezerra 17' (pen.), (yellow card) 52' (yellow-red card) 56'; Offor 37', (90+1)	Report	Diallo (yellow card) 45+1'; Turner 51' (pen.); Donovan 57', 72'; Jasinski (red card) 70'	Stadium: SeatGeek Stadium; Referee: Laura Rodriguez
	Shootout
	Offor (penalty scored); Monis (penalty scored); Penn (penalty scored); Kidd (penalty scored); Quintos (penalty scored)		Craig (penalty scored); Gilman (penalty missed); Stojanovic (penalty scored); Donovan (penalty scored); Turner (penalty scored)

April 30, 2022 5	Philadelphia Union II	2–1	New York City FC II	Chester, Pennsylvania
4:00 PM EDT	Donovan 50'; Craig 75'	Report	Stephen Turnbull 90+2'	Stadium: Subaru Park; Referee: Gary Gutierrez

May 7, 2022 6	Inter Miami II	1–2	Philadelphia Union II	Fort Lauderdale, Florida
7:00 PM EDT	Thomas 10'	Report	Pierre 45', 54'	Stadium: DRV PNK Stadium; Referee: Alejo Calume

May 16, 2022 7	Philadelphia Union II	1–0	Orlando City B	Chester, Pennsylvania
7:00pm	Sorenson (yellow card) 43'; Aaronson 51'; Darboe (yellow card) 68'	Report	Guske (yellow card) 29'; Rivera (yellow card) 32'; Lopez (yellow card) 70'; Tablante (yellow card) 71'; Yan (yellow card) 74'	Stadium: Subaru Park; Referee: John Griggs

May 21, 2022 8	Rochester New York FC	3–0	Philadelphia Union II	Brighton, New York
	Dolabella 33', 90+2'; Akanyirige (yellow card) 49' (yellow-red card) 61'; Rayo 62' (pen.)	Report	Riasco (yellow card) 41'; Craig (yellow card) 62'	Stadium: John L. DiMarco Field; Referee: Abdou Ndiaye

May 27, 2022 9	New England Revolution II	1–0	Philadelphia Union II	Foxborough, Massachusetts
7:00 PM EDT	N Buck (yellow card) 25'; Silva 34'; Italo (yellow card) 90+1'	Report	Nkanji (yellow card) 24'; Westfield (yellow card) 32'; Diallo (yellow card) 49'	Stadium: Gillette Stadium; Referee: Joshua Encarnación

June 11, 2022 10	Toronto FC II	1–0	Philadelphia Union II	Toronto, Ontario
6:00 PM EDT	Greenidge-Duncan 90+2'	Report		Stadium: York Lions Stadium; Referee: Youcef Boumsied

June 19, 2022 11	Philadelphia Union II	1–1 (3–0 SO)	Chicago Fire II	Chester, Pennsylvania
2:00 PM EDT	Pierre 29'	Report	Glasgow 49'	Stadium: Subaru Park; Referee: Jeremy Scheer
	Shootout
	Real (penalty scored); Sorenson (penalty scored); Donovan (penalty scored)		Bezerra (penalty missed); Ostrem (penalty missed); Ritaccio (penalty missed)

June 27, 2022 12	Philadelphia Union II	0–5	New York City FC II	Chester, Pennsylvania
7:00 PM EDT	Riasco (yellow card) 56' (yellow-red card) 57'	Report	Jasson 7'; Denis 36'; Murania Yankowitz 59'; Beer 80'; Jimenez 89'	Stadium: Subaru Park; Referee: José Carlos Rivero

July 7, 2022 13	Rochester New York FC	3–0	Philadelphia Union II	Brighton, New York
7:00pm	Rayo 24', 28', 60'	Report		Stadium: Monroe Community College; Referee: Jeremy Scheer

July 18, 2022 14	Philadelphia Union II	1–2	Toronto FC II	Chester, Pennsylvania
6:00 PM EDT	Real 70'	Report	Karajovanovic 17'; Altobelli 89'	Stadium: Subaru Park; Referee: Scarlet Agrawal

July 24, 2022 15	Orlando City B	1–3	Philadelphia Union II	Kissimmee, Florida
7:00pm	Otero (red card) 77'; Pareja (yellow card) 82' (yellow-red card) 90+6'; Subachan 85'; Forth (yellow card) 90+5'	Report	Perdomo (yellow card) 9'; Diallo (yellow card) 24'; Real 52'; Freese (red card) 69'; Bueno 87'; Pierre 90+4', (yellow card) 90+4'; Villero (yellow card) 90+6'	Stadium: Osceola County Stadium; Referee: Anya Voigt

July 31, 2022 16	Philadelphia Union II	2–1	Columbus Crew 2	Chester, Pennsylvania
6:00 PM EDT	Aaronson 33'; Riasco (yellow card) 45+2'; Bueno (yellow card) 48'; Stojanovic 90+1'	Report	J. Morris (yellow card) 35'; Farsi (yellow card) 50'; Fuson 64'	Stadium: Subaru Park; Referee: Kenneth Rojas

August 7, 2022 17	FC Cincinnati 2	2–3	Philadelphia Union II	Milford, Ohio
	Ordonez 54'; Thomas 85'	Report	Bueno 24', 57'; Donovan 51'	Stadium: Mercy Health Training Center; Referee: Nabil Bensalah

August 14, 2022 18	Philadelphia Union II	2–2 (5–4 SO)	Inter Miami II	Chester, Pennsylvania
6:00 PM EDT	Riasco 35'; Aaronson 43'	Report	Beckham 29' (pen.); Sunderland 76'	Stadium: Subaru Park; Referee: Kenneth Rojas
	Shootout
	Craig (penalty scored); Sorenson (penalty missed); Sullivan (penalty scored); Bueno (penalty scored); Turner (penalty scored); Pierre (penalty scored)		Allen (penalty scored); Acosta (penalty scored); Destin (penalty missed); Borgelin (penalty scored); Beckham (penalty scored); Caputo (penalty missed)

August 21, 2022 19	Philadelphia Union II	5–1	New England Revolution II	Chester, Pennsylvania
7:00 PM EDT	Riasco (yellow card) 20'; Real 54'; Bueno 61', 63'; Harriel 67'; Craig (yellow card) 77'; Diallo (yellow card) 78'; Sullivan 79'	Report	Rozhansky (yellow card) 30' (yellow-red card) , 36'; Silva (yellow card) 45+1'; Michel (yellow card) 64'; Quiñones 87'; DeShields (red card) 89'	Stadium: Subaru Park; Referee: Amiel Aleman

August 24, 2022 20	New York City FC II	1–2	Philadelphia Union II	Queens, New York
	Haxhari (yellow card) 36'; Jimenez 58'	Report	Riasco (yellow card) 28', (goal) 64'; Oliver (yellow card) 83'; Pierre 86'	Stadium: Belson Stadium; Referee: Melinda Sopka

August 27, 2022 21	Columbus Crew 2	2–0	Philadelphia Union II	Columbus, Ohio
5:30 PM EDT	Parente (yellow card) 18'; Weber (yellow card) 33'; Morris 40'; Zawadzki (yellow card) 56'; Russell-Rowe 84'	Report	Darboe (yellow card) 12' (yellow-red card) 59'; Nkanji (yellow card) 89'	Stadium: Historic Crew Stadium; Referee: Alyssa Nichols

September 4, 2022 22	Philadelphia Union II	1–2	Rochester New York FC	Chester, Pennsylvania
3:30pm EDT	Donovan 62'	Report	Inalien 44'; Williams 90+3'	Stadium: Subaru Park; Referee: Nabil Bensalah

September 11, 2022 23	Philadelphia Union II	6–1	Orlando City B	Chester, Pennsylvania
1:00pm	Donovan 6', 22'; Bueno (yellow card) 9'; Sullivan 24', 25'; Riasco 46', (yellow card) 78'; Harriel (yellow card) 53'; Aaronson 56' (pen.)	Report	Reid-Brown (yellow card) 2'; Romero (yellow card) 45'; Forth (yellow card) 55'; Loyola 69', (yellow card) 85'; Granados (yellow card) 74'	Stadium: Subaru Park; Referee: Sergii Demianchuk

September 18, 2022 24	New England Revolution II	1–3	Philadelphia Union II	Foxborough, Massachusetts
3:00 PM EDT	Weinstein (yellow card) 12'; Weverton (penalty missed) 42', (yellow card) 52'; Quiñónes (yellow card) 47'; Lima 79'	Report	Real 14', (yellow card) 43'; Rafanello 20'; Donovan 27'; Harriel (yellow card) 45'; Odada (yellow card) 52'; Sorenson (yellow card) 90'; Westfield (yellow card) 90+4'	Stadium: Gillette Stadium; Referee: Natalie Simon

=== Playoffs ===
September 24, 2022 Conference Semifinals	Toronto FC II	1–0	Philadelphia Union II	Toronto, Ontario
4:00 PM EDT	Mbongue 6'	Report	Sorenson (yellow card) 33'; Villero (yellow card) 39'; Turner (yellow card) 81'; Paternina (yellow card) 85'	Stadium: BMO Field; Referee: Michael Venne
