= 2023 Philadelphia Union season =

Philadelphia Union
2023 season
- Owner: Keystone Sports & Entertainment
- Head coach: Jim Curtin
- Stadium: Subaru Park (Capacity: 18,500)
- MLS: East: 4th Overall: 5th
- MLS Cup Playoffs: Conference Semifinals
- U.S. Open Cup: Round of 32
- CONCACAF Champions League: Semifinals
- Average home league attendance: 18,907
Home colors	Away colors

The 2023 Philadelphia Union season was the club's fourteenth season in Major League Soccer, the top flight of American soccer. The team was managed by Jim Curtin, his tenth season with the club. The club's regular season began on February 25, 2023, and concluded on October 9. Outside of MLS, Philadelphia participated in the U.S. Open Cup, the CONCACAF Champions League, and the Leagues Cup.

== Background ==
The club finished second in the Supporters' Shield standings and first in the Eastern Conference. The Union appeared in their first MLS Cup, where they lost to Shield winners Los Angeles FC in a penalty shootout.

== 2023 Roster ==
As of March 2, 2025

Note: Flags indicate national team as defined under FIFA eligibility rules; some limited exceptions apply. Players may hold more than one non-FIFA nationality.

No.	Pos.	Nation	Player
2	DF	USA	Matthew Real (HGP)
3	DF	ENG	Jack Elliott
5	DF	NOR	Jakob Glesnes
6	MF	USA	Andrés Perea
7	FW	DEN	Mikael Uhre (DP)
8	MF	VEN	José Martínez
9	FW	ARG	Julián Carranza (DP)
10	MF	HUN	Daniel Gazdag
11	MF	USA	Alejandro Bedoya (Captain)
12	GK	USA	Joe Bendik
13	GK	USA	Holden Trent
14	MF	USA	Jeremy Rafanello (HGP)
15	DF	CMR	Olivier Mbaizo
16	MF	USA	Jack McGlynn (HGP)
17	DF	JAM	Damion Lowe

No.	Pos.	Nation	Player
18	GK	JAM	Andre Blake (GA)
19	MF	ARG	Joaquín Torres
20	MF	VEN	Jesús Bueno
23	FW	USA	Nelson Pierre (HGP)
24	DF	USA	Anton Sorenson (HGP)
25	FW	USA	Chris Donovan
26	DF	USA	Nathan Harriel (HGP)
27	DF	GER	Kai Wagner
28	FW	ISR	Tai Baribo
29	DF	RSA	Olwethu Makhanya
30	MF	USA	Paxten Aaronson (HGP)
31	MF	USA	Leon Flach
33	MF	USA	Quinn Sullivan (HGP)
34	DF	USA	Brandan Craig (HGP)

== Transfers ==
=== In ===
Date	No.	Pos.	Player	Transferred from	Fee/notes	Source
December 6, 2022	6	MF	(United States) Andrés Perea	(United States) Orlando City SC	$450,000 2023 GAM $300,000 2024 GAM $100,000 additional GAM	
January 25, 2023	17	DF	(Jamaica) Damion Lowe	(United States) Inter Miami FC	$225,000; 2024 Natural 1st Rnd Draft Pick; HG Rights to Shanyder Borgelin	
January 26, 2023	19	MF	(Argentina) Joaquín Torres	(Canada) CF Montréal	$500,000; Up to $300,000 additional	
February 16, 2023	13	GK	(United States) Holden Trent	(United States) Philadelphia Union II	2023 MLS SuperDraft	
February 21, 2023	23	FW	(United States) Nelson Pierre	(United States) Philadelphia Union II	Homegrown signing	
July 18, 2023	29	DF	(South Africa) Olwethu Makhanya	(South Africa) Stellenbosch FC	Transfer, U-22 Initiative	
August 2, 2023	28	FW	(Israel) Tai Baribo	(Australia) Wolfsberger AC	Transfer	

=== Out ===
Date	No.	Pos.	Player	Transferred to	Fee/notes	Source
November 15, 2022	13	MF	(United States) Cole Turner	(United States) Loudoun United FC	Option declined	
November 15, 2022	19	FW	(Jamaica) Cory Burke	(United States) New York Red Bulls	Option declined	
November 17, 2023	30	MF	(United States) Paxten Aaronson	(Germany) Eintracht Frankfurt	$4,000,000; Add'l incentives 20% sell-on fee	
January 27, 2023	1	GK	(United States) Matt Freese	(United States) New York City FC	$200,000 2023 GAM $150,000 2024 GAM $400,000 additional	
February 8, 2023	17	DF	(Ghana) Abasa Aremeyaw	(Ghana) MŠK Žilina Africa F.C.	Mutual consent	

=== Loan Out ===
Date	No.	Pos.	Player	Transferred to	Fee/notes	Source
August 23, 2023	21	MF	(Kenya) Richard Odada	(Denmark) AaB Fodbold	Loaned out through June 2024	

== Non-competitive ==
=== Preseason exhibitions ===
January 21	Philadelphia Union	3–2	Austin FC	Bradenton, FL
12:00 pm EST	Bedoya 45+4'; Bueno 67'; Donovan 80'	Report	Cascante 27'; Noel 54'	Stadium: IMG Academy; Attendance: 0

January 24	Philadelphia Union	2–2	St. Louis City SC	Orlando, FL
4:00 pm EST	Wagner 9'; Portella 75'	Report	Klauss 41'; Gioacchini 86'	Stadium: UCF Soccer and Track Stadium; Attendance: 0

January 27	Philadelphia Union	2–2	Minnesota United FC	Orlando, FL
	Lod; Pacheco	Report	Carranza; Gazdag	Stadium: UCF Soccer and Track Stadium; Attendance: 0

February 5	New England Revolution	0–2	Philadelphia Union	Lakewood Ranch, FL
12:00 pm EST	Blessing (yellow card) 40'; Vrioni (yellow card) 57'	Report	Gazdag 35'; Glesnes (yellow card) 40'; Bueno 71'	Stadium: Premier Sports Complex; Attendance: 0

February 10	FC Cincinnati	1–3	Philadelphia Union	Clearwater, FL
12:00 pm EST	Vazquez 56' (pen.)	Report	Torres 10'; Carranza 49'; Gazdag 61' (pen.)	Stadium: Joe DiMaggio Sports Complex; Attendance: Not reported

February 13	Nashville SC	2-0	Philadelphia Union

February 18	Philadelphia Union	4–1	Colorado Rapids	Davenport, FL
1:00 pm EST	Gazdag 49'; Harriel 102'; Torres 106' (pen.); Donovan 125'	Report	Cabral 108'	Stadium: ChampionsGate Sports Complex
Note: 135-minutes (3 45-minute periods)

== Competitive ==
=== Major League Soccer ===
==== Standings ====
===== Eastern Conference =====
MLS Eastern Conference table (2023)
Pos	Team	Pld	W	L	T	GF	GA	GD	Pts	Qualification
2	Orlando City SC	34	18	7	9	55	39	+16	63	Qualification for round one
3	Columbus Crew	34	16	9	9	67	46	+21	57	Qualification for round one
4	Philadelphia Union	34	15	9	10	57	41	+16	55	Qualification for round one
5	New England Revolution	34	15	9	10	58	46	+12	55	Qualification for round one
6	Atlanta United FC	34	13	9	12	66	53	+13	51	Qualification for round one

Source: MLS
Rules for classification: 1) points; 2) total wins; 3) total goal differential; 4) total goals scored; 5) fewer disciplinary points; 6) away goal differential; 7) away goals scored; 8) home goals differential; 9) home goals scored; 10) coin toss (2 clubs tied) or drawing of lots (≥3 clubs tied)

===== Overall table =====
Overall MLS standings table
Pos	Team	Pld	W	L	T	GF	GA	GD	Pts	Qualification
3	Columbus Crew (C)	34	16	9	9	67	46	+21	57	Qualification for the CONCACAF Champions Cup Round of 16 (Note: As 2023 MLS Cup champions)
4	St. Louis City SC	34	17	12	5	62	45	+17	56	Qualification for the CONCACAF Champions Cup Round One (Note: As 2023 Western Conference regular season champions)
5	Philadelphia Union	34	15	9	10	57	41	+16	55	Qualification for the CONCACAF Champions Cup Round One (Note: As 2023 Leagues Cup third place)
6	New England Revolution	34	15	9	10	58	46	+12	55	Qualification for the CONCACAF Champions Cup Round One (Note: As second highest-ranked club in 2023 MLS Supporters' Shield not already qualified)
7	Seattle Sounders FC	34	14	9	11	41	32	+9	53	Qualification for the U.S. Open Cup Round of 32 (Note: As one of the top seven teams in the overall table to not qualify for the 2024 CONCACAF Champions Cup)

Source: MLS
Rules for classification: 1) points; 2) total wins; 3) total goal differential; 4) total goals scored; 5) fewer disciplinary points; 6) away goal differential; 7) away goals scored; 8) home goals differential; 9) home goals scored; 10) coin toss (2 clubs tied) or drawing of lots (≥3 clubs tied)
(C) MLS Cup champion

=== Regular season ===
February 25 1	Philadelphia Union	4–1	Columbus Crew	Chester, Pennsylvania
7:30PM EST	Gazdag 45+3' (pen.), 72' (pen.); Flach (yellow card) 47'; Carranza 52', 80'	Report	Glesnes 28' (o.g.); Morris (yellow card) 39'; Sands (yellow card) 43'; Hernández (yellow card) 56'; Zelarayán (yellow card) 59'; Degenek (yellow card) 71'	Stadium: Subaru Park; Attendance: 18,510; Referee: Lukasz Szpala

March 4 2	Inter Miami CF	2–0	Philadelphia Union	Fort Lauderdale, Florida
7:30PM EST	Yedlin (yellow card) 30'; Jean 32'; Taylor 77'	Report	Flach (yellow card) 21'; Martínez (yellow card) 24'; Bedoya (yellow card) 79'	Stadium: DRV PNK Stadium; Attendance: 15,628; Referee: Chris Penso

March 11 3	Philadelphia Union	1–0	Chicago Fire	Chester, Pennsylvania
8:30PM EST	(yellow card) 45+2' Martínez; (yellow card) 61' Elliott; (yellow card) 74' Bedoya; 90', (yellow card) 90+3' Torres; (yellow card) 96' Sullivan	Report	(yellow card) 12' Terán; (yellow card) 38, 94' (yellow-red card) Kamara; (yellow card) 42' M. Navarro; (yellow card) 45+2, 50' (yellow-red card) Herbers	Stadium: Subaru Park; Attendance: 18,520; Referee: Guido Gonzales Jr.

March 18 4	CF Montréal	3–2	Philadelphia Union	Montreal, Quebec
7:30 PM EDT	Quioto 3' (pen.), (yellow card) 43', (goal) 90+8'; Wanyama (yellow card) 18'; Zouhir (yellow card) 43'; Offor 90', (yellow card) 90+7'	Report	Glesnes (yellow card) 2'; Uhre 46', 60'; Carranza (yellow card) 58, 69' (yellow-red card); Bedoya (yellow card) 90+6'	Stadium: Olympic Stadium; Attendance: 23,352; Referee: Nima Saghafi

March 25 5	Philadelphia Union	1–2	Orlando City SC	Chester, Pennsylvania
7:30 PM EDT	Perea 17'; J. Torres (yellow card) 88'; Wagner (yellow card) 88'	Report	Ojeda 2'; Angulo 9', (yellow card) 36'; Felipe (yellow card) 20'	Stadium: Subaru Park; Attendance: 18,725; Referee: Allen Chapman

April 1 6	Philadelphia Union	0–0	Sporting Kansas City	Chester, Pennsylvania
8:30 PM EDT	Harriel (yellow card) 18'; Gazdag (yellow card) 40'; Martínez (yellow card) 72'	Report	Agada (yellow card) 16'; Walter (yellow card) 90+5'	Stadium: Subaru Park; Attendance: 18,550; Referee: Victor Rivas

April 8 7	FC Cincinnati	1–0	Philadelphia Union	Cincinnati, Ohio
7:30PM EDT	Mosquera (yellow card) 48'; Acosta 69' (pen.)	Report	Mbaizo (yellow card) 21'; Blake (yellow card) 69'	Stadium: TQL Stadium; Attendance: 25,513; Referee: Ted Unkel

April 15 8	Chicago Fire	2–2	Philadelphia Union	Chicago, Illinois
9:30PM EDT	19' Haile-Selassie; 47' (o.g.) Harriel; (yellow card) 66' Herbers; (yellow card) 90+5' Giménez	Report	62' (pen.) Gazdag; 65' Carranza	Stadium: Soldier Field; Attendance: 12,811; Referee: Ismail Elfath

April 22 9	Philadelphia Union	4–2	Toronto FC	Chester, Pennsylvania
7:30 PM EDT	MacNaughton 16' (o.g.); Uhre 20', 43', 56'; Elliott (yellow card) 36'; Carranza (yellow card) 63'	Report	Insigne (yellow card) 45+1', (goal) 66'; Laryea 90+2'	Stadium: Subaru Park; Attendance: 18,533; Referee: Alex Chilowicz

May 6 10	New York Red Bulls	0–1	Philadelphia Union	Harrison, New Jersey
7:30PM	Reyes (yellow card) 25'; Burke (yellow card) 68'	Report	Gazdag 31' (pen.); Flach (yellow card) 36'; Sullivan (yellow card) 45+7'	Stadium: Red Bull Arena; Attendance: 18,712; Referee: Joseph Dickerson

May 13 11	Colorado Rapids	1–2	Philadelphia Union	Commerce City, Colorado
7:30 PM	Wilson (yellow card) 18'; Ronan 38'; Abubakar (yellow card) 42'; Cabral (yellow card) 62'; Nicholson (yellow card) 79'; Barrios (yellow card) 90+9'; Galván (red card) 90+9'	Report	Bedoya (yellow card) 21'; Flach (yellow card) 41'; Wagner 45+2'; Carranza 52'; Elliott 90+9'; Glesnes (yellow card) 90+9'; Bueno (red card) 90+14'	Stadium: Dick's Sporting Goods Park; Attendance: 15,006; Referee: Victor Rivas

May 17 12	Philadelphia Union	0–0	D.C. United	Chester, Pennsylvania
7:30 EDT	Carranza (yellow card) 9'; Martínez (yellow card) 90+3'	Report	Williams (yellow card) 48'	Stadium: Subaru Park; Attendance: 18,689; Referee: Pierre-Luc Lauziere

May 20 13	Philadelphia Union	3–0	New England Revolution	Chester, Pennsylvania
7:30 PM EDT	Gazdag 56', 74' (pen.); Carranza 88'; Real (yellow card) 90+3'	Report	Blessing (yellow card) 4'; Wood (yellow card) 45'; Gil (yellow card) 73'; Altidore (yellow card) 84'; Romney (yellow card) 90'	Stadium: Subaru Park; Attendance: 19,079; Referee: Lukasz Szpala

May 27 14	New York City FC	1–3	Philadelphia Union	New York, New York
7:30PM EST	Pereira 37'; Gray (yellow card) 38'; Thiago Martins (yellow card) 52'; O'Toole (yellow card) 61'	Report	Glesnes (yellow card) 30'; Carranza 45+1', 45+3'; Gazdag 53' (pen.); Uhre (yellow card) 69'; Bueno (yellow card) 83'	Stadium: Citi Field; Attendance: 22,830; Referee: Guido Gonzales Jr.

May 31 15	Philadelphia Union	1–0	Charlotte FC	Chester, Pennsylvania
7:30 PM EDT	Lowe (yellow card) 59'; Kahlina 70' (o.g.)	Report	Westwood (yellow card) 12'	Stadium: Subaru Park; Attendance: 18,705; Referee: Ted Unkel

June 3 16	Philadelphia Union	3–0	CF Montréal	Chester, Pennsylvania
7:30 PM EDT	Carranza 12', 61'; Uhre 36'; Martínez (yellow card) 88'	Report	Campbell (yellow card) 31'; Thorkelsson (yellow card) 76'; Miljevic (yellow card) 88'	Stadium: Subaru Park; Attendance: 19,245; Referee: Jon Freemon

June 10 17	San Jose Earthquakes	2–1	Philadelphia Union	San Jose, California
10:30 PM EDT	Ebobisse 8'; Trauco 57'	Report	Lowe 17'	Stadium: PayPal Park; Attendance: 15,512; Referee: Nima Saghafi

June 21 18	Orlando City SC	2–2	Philadelphia Union	Orlando, Florida
7:30 PM EDT	McGuire 13'; Ojeda 54'; Stajduhar (yellow card) 61'; Enrique (yellow card) 82'; Kara (yellow card) 88'	Report	Mbaizo (yellow card) 28'; Flach (yellow card) 38'; McGlynn 60'; Carranza (yellow card) 62'; Wagner (yellow card) 83'; Martínez 90'	Stadium: Exploria Stadium; Attendance: 17,516; Referee: Alex Chilowicz

June 24 19	Philadelphia Union	4–1	Inter Miami CF	Chester, Pennsylvania
7:30 PM EDT	Glesnes 14'; Uhre (yellow card) 15'; Martínez (yellow card) 24'; Carranza 39'; Flach 45+4'; Ruíz 68' (o.g.)	Report	Taylor 50'; Robinson (yellow card) 84'	Stadium: Subaru Park; Attendance: 19,535; Referee: Malik Badawi

July 2 20	Atlanta United FC	2–0	Philadelphia Union	Atlanta, Georgia
4:00 PM EDT	Almada 7'; Sejdic (yellow card) 70'; Ibarra (yellow card) 75'; Lennon 79'	Report	Harriel (yellow card) 4'; Carranza (yellow card) 48'; Uhre (yellow card) 65'; Torres (yellow card) 90+3'	Stadium: Mercedes-Benz Stadium; Attendance: 43,527; Referee: Ted Unkel

July 8 21	LA Galaxy	3–1	Philadelphia Union	Carson, California
10:30 PM EDT	Boyd 15'; Mbaizo 45+1' (o.g.); Judd (yellow card) 45+2'; Costa (yellow card) 68'; Joveljic (yellow card) 70'; Puig 76'	Report	Martínez (yellow card) 5'; Uhre 36'; Bedoya (yellow card) 37'; Gazdag (yellow card) 88'	Stadium: Dignity Health Sports Park; Attendance: 21,269; Referee: Fotis Bazakos

July 12 22	Nashville SC	0–2	Philadelphia Union	Nashville, Tennessee
8:30 PM EDT	Lovitz (yellow card) 39' (yellow-red card) 81'; Leal (yellow card) 43'; Bunbury (yellow card) 71'; Moore (red card) 90+5'	Report	Gazdag 40' (pen.), 84' (pen.), (yellow card) 84'; Wagner (yellow card) 44'; Carranza (red card) 90+5'	Stadium: Geodis Park; Attendance: 30,109; Referee: Sergii Boiko

July 15 23	Philadelphia Union	2–1	New York City FC	Chester, Pennsylvania
7:30 PM EST	Martínez 23'; Donovan 81'	Report	Jasson 86'	Stadium: Subaru Park; Attendance: 19,363; Referee: Alex Chilowicz

August 26 24	D.C. United	1–3	Philadelphia Union	Washington, D.C.
7:30 PM EST	Miller (yellow card) 36'; Ku-DiPietro 88'	Report	Uhre 5'; McGlynn 13'; Gazdag 38' (pen.); Harriel (yellow card) 68'; Glesnes (yellow card) 76'; Donovan (yellow card) 90+4'	Stadium: Audi Field; Attendance: 19,215; Referee: Marcos de Oliveira

August 30 25	Toronto FC	3–1	Philadelphia Union	Toronto, Ontario
7:30 PM EST	Insigne 23', (yellow card) 90+3'; Kerr 58'; Osorio 63'; Ibarra (yellow card) 76'; Romero (yellow card) 87'; Vázquez (yellow card) 90+6'	Report	Carranza 45'; Glesnes (yellow card) 90+1'; Martínez (yellow card) 90+4'; Bueno (red card) 90+7'	Stadium: BMO Field; Attendance: 25,410; Referee: Mark Allatin

September 3 26	Philadelphia Union	4–1	New York Red Bulls	Chester, Pennsylvania
7:30 PM EST	Glesnes 29'; Lowe (yellow card) 37', (goal) 57'; McGlynn (yellow card) 45+5'; Carranza 58'; Gazdag 76'; Bedoya (yellow card) 80'; Baribo (yellow card) 85'	Report	Nealis (yellow card) 6' (yellow-red card) 44'; Fernandez 11'; Reyes (yellow card) 24'	Stadium: Subaru Park; Attendance: 19,361; Referee: Rubiel Vazquez

September 16 27	Philadelphia Union	2–2	FC Cincinnati	Chester, Pennsylvania
7:30 PM EST	Elliott (yellow card) 19' (yellow-red card) 90+4'; Gazdag (yellow card) 21', (goal) 37' (pen.); Martínez 23'; Lowe (yellow card) 42'; Carranza (yellow card) 63'; Wagner (yellow card) 74'; Baribo (yellow card) 85'	Report	Miazga (yellow card) 19'; Celentano (yellow card) 35'; Mosquera (yellow card) 36' (yellow-red card) 83'; Hagglund (yellow card) 45+4'; Boupendza 49'; Vázquez 76'	Stadium: Subaru Park; Attendance: 19,365; Referee: Ismail Elfath

September 20 28	Charlotte FC	2–2	Philadelphia Union	Charlotte, North Carolina
7:30 PM EST	Meram 55'; Świderski 61'; Jóźwiak (yellow card) 89'; Westwood (yellow card) 90+1'; Agyemang (yellow card) 90+10'	Report	Martínez (yellow card) 52'; Sullivan 70'; Gazdag 90+7'	Stadium: Bank of America Stadium; Attendance: 28,584; Referee: Guido Gonzales Jr.

September 23 29	Philadelphia Union	0–0	Los Angeles FC	Chester, Pennsylvania
7:30 PM EST		Report	Long (yellow card) 2'; Palencia (yellow card) 79'	Stadium: Subaru Park; Attendance: 18,738; Referee: Allen Chapman

September 27 30	Philadelphia Union	1–1	FC Dallas	Chester, Pennsylvania
7:30 PM EST	Mbaizo (yellow card) 21'; Bueno (yellow card) 24'; Sullivan 25'	Report	Velasco (yellow card) 28', (goal) 36'; Twumasi (yellow card) 90+1'	Stadium: Subaru Park; Attendance: 18,515; Referee: Fotis Bazakos
Note: Match originally scheduled for August 20

September 30 31	Columbus Crew	1–1	Philadelphia Union	Columbus, Ohio
7:30 PM EST	Amundsen (yellow card) 67'; Hernández 72' (pen.), (yellow card) 84'	Report	Harriel 50'; Lowe (yellow card) 52'; Elliott (yellow card) 71'; Wagner (yellow card) 72'; Bueno (yellow card) 72'	Stadium: Lower.com Field; Attendance: 20,456; Referee: Jon Freemon

October 4 32	Philadelphia Union	3–2	Atlanta United FC	Chester, Pennsylvania
7:30 PM EST	Elliott (yellow card) 34'; Gazdag 39'; Uhre 41'; Carranza 45+3'; Sullivan (yellow card) 66'; Martínez (yellow card) 75'; Harriel (yellow card) 81'	Report	Almada 56' (pen.); Thiaré (yellow card) 75'; Mosquera 77'	Stadium: Subaru Park; Attendance: 18,605; Referee: Alex Chilowicz

October 7 33	Philadelphia Union	0–0	Nashville SC	Chester, Pennsylvania
7:30 PM EST	Martínez (yellow card) 24'; Glesnes (yellow card) 90'	Report	Maher (yellow card) 18'; Zimmerman (yellow card) 72'	Stadium: Subaru Park; Attendance: 19,387; Referee: Armando Villarreal

October 21 34	New England Revolution	2–1	Philadelphia Union	Foxborough, Massachusetts
6:00 PM EST	Bou 25' (pen.), 42'	Report	Harriel (yellow card) 7'; Carranza 16', (yellow card) 90+2'; Lowe (yellow card) 24'; Wagner (yellow card) 24'	Stadium: Gillette Stadium; Attendance: 41,355; Referee: Tori Penso

=== MLS Cup Playoffs ===
October 28 Round One	Philadelphia Union	3–1	New England Revolution	Chester, Pennsylvania
5:00 pm EDT	Gazdag 19' (pen.); Uhre 26'; Harriel 37'; Martínez (yellow card) 87'	Report	Wood (yellow card) 29'; Farrell (yellow card) 35'; Chancalay (yellow card) 37'; Bou 68'; Vrioni (yellow card) 87'	Stadium: Lincoln Financial Field; Attendance: 19,778; Referee: Pierre-Luc Lauziere

November 8 Round One	New England Revolution	0–1	Philadelphia Union	Foxborough, Massachusetts
7:00 pm EST	Kaye (red card) 45'; C. Gil (yellow card) 90+4'	Report	Lowe (yellow card) 33'; Donovan 79'	Stadium: Gillette Stadium; Attendance: 15,214; Referee: Drew Fischer
Note: Philadelphia Union won the series 2–0.

November 25 Conference semifinals	FC Cincinnati	1–0	Philadelphia Union	Cincinnati, Ohio
8:00 pm ET	Gaddis (yellow card) 30'; Boupendza (yellow card) 76'; Mosquera 90+4'	Report	Lowe (yellow card) 11'; Carranza (yellow card) 51'	Stadium: TQL Stadium; Attendance: 25,513; Referee: Ismail Elfath

=== U.S. Open Cup ===
May 9 Round of 32	Minnesota United FC (MLS)	3–3 (a.e.t.) (7–6 p)	(Pennsylvania) Philadelphia Union (MLS)	Saint Paul, Minnesota
7:30 PM CDT	Lod (yellow card) 30'; Hlongwane 68', 103'; Rosales 74' (yellow card) 90+2'; Arriaga (yellow card) 102'	Report	Lowe (yellow card) 34'; Donovan 78'; Wagner (yellow card) 90' (goal) 90+4', 120'; Elliott (yellow card) 110'; Real (yellow card) 115'	Stadium: Allianz Field; Attendance: 4,216; Referee: Fotis Bazakos
	Penalties
	Fragapane (penalty scored); Trapp (penalty scored); Arriaga (penalty missed); Rosales (penalty scored); Dunbar (penalty scored); Kallman (penalty scored); Boxall (penalty scored); Tapias (penalty scored)		Gazdag (penalty scored); Elliott (penalty scored); Real (penalty missed); Torres (penalty scored); Carranza (penalty scored); Rafanello (penalty scored); Lowe (penalty scored); Wagner (penalty missed)

=== CONCACAF Champions League ===
==== Round of 16 ====
March 7 First leg	Alianza (El Salvador)	0–0	(United States) Philadelphia Union	San Salvador, El Salvador
8:00 pm EST		Report	Bueno (yellow card) 41'; Lowe (yellow card) 65'	Stadium: Estadio Cuscatlán; Referee: César Ramos (Mexico)

March 14 Second leg	Philadelphia Union (United States)	4–0 (4–0 agg.)	(El Salvador) Alianza	Chester, United States
8:00 pm EST	Lowe 45+1'; Carranza (yellow card) 56'; Gazdag 62' (pen.); McGlynn (yellow card) 73'; Perea 81', 84'	Report	Montes (yellow card) 18' (yellow-red card) 41'	Stadium: Subaru Park; Attendance: 8,145; Referee: Bryan López (Guatemala)
Note: Philadelphia Union advance 4–0 on aggregate.

==== Quarter-finals ====
April 4 First leg	Philadelphia Union (United States)	1–0	(Mexico) Atlas	Chester, United States
8:00 PM EDT	Gazdag 89' (pen.)	Report	Santamaría (red card) 45+5'; Abella (yellow card) 64'; Lozano (yellow card) 88'	Stadium: Subaru Park; Referee: Saíd Martínez (Honduras)

April 12 Second leg	Atlas (Mexico)	2–2 (2–3 agg.)	(United States) Philadelphia Union	Guadalajara, Mexico
8:00 PM CDT	Quiñones 11'; Furch 45+1'; Mora (yellow card) 45+2'; Reyes (yellow card) 50'; Nervo (yellow card) 83'; Rocha (yellow card) 87' (yellow-red card); Hernández (yellow card) 88'	Report	Mbaizo (yellow card) 34'; Carranza 27', 78'	Stadium: Estadio Jalisco; Referee: Iván Barton (El Salvador)
Note: Philadelphia Union advance 3–2 on aggregate.

==== Semi-finals ====
April 26 First leg	Philadelphia Union (United States)	1–1	(United States) Los Angeles FC	Chester, United States
9:00 PM EDT	Martínez (yellow card) 63'; Gazdag 86' (pen.)	Report	Acosta (yellow card) 84', (goal) 90+1'	Stadium: Subaru Park; Attendance: 17,676; Referee: César Ramos (Mexico)

May 2 Second Leg	Los Angeles FC (United States)	3–0 (4–1 agg.)	(United States) Philadelphia Union	Los Angeles, United States
7:00 PM PDT	Tillman 13'; Bouanga (yellow card) 17', (goal) 90'; Murillo (yellow card) 43'; Opoku 82'	Report	Bedoya (yellow card) 2'; Uhre (yellow card) 37'; Mbaizo (yellow card) 41' (yellow-red card) 59'	Stadium: BMO Stadium; Attendance: 19,985; Referee: Drew Fischer (Canada)
Note: Los Angeles FC advance 4–1 on aggregate.

=== Leagues Cup ===
==== Group stage ====
===== Standings =====
Pos	Team	Pld	W	PW	PL	L	GF	GA	GD	Pts	Qualification	PHI	QFC	TIJ
1	(United States) Philadelphia Union	2	2	0	0	0	8	2	+6	6	Advance to knockout stage	—	5–1	3–1
2	(Mexico) Querétaro	2	1	0	0	1	2	5	−3	3	Advance to knockout stage	—	—	—
3	(Mexico) Tijuana	2	0	0	0	2	1	4	−3	0		—	0–1	—

Source: Leagues Cup
Rules for classification: Tiebreakers

===== Results =====
July 22 Group stage 1	Philadelphia Union (United States)	3–1	(Mexico) Tijuana	Chester, Pennsylvania
8:00 pm ET	Gazdag 21' (pen.); Carranza 26', 71'; Martínez (yellow card) 35'; Lowe (yellow card) 90+5'	Report	Díaz (red card) 19'; González 46'; Balanta (red card) 56'	Stadium: Subaru Park; Attendance: 17,731; Referee: Oshane Nation

July 26 Group stage 2	Philadelphia Union (United States)	5–1	(Mexico) Querétaro	Chester, Pennsylvania
7:30 pm ET	Uhre (yellow card) 10'; Gazdag 30', 39' (pen.), 63' (pen.); Harriel 43'; Glesnes (yellow card) 45'; McGlynn 89'	Report	Lértora (yellow card) 20'; Sandoval 84'	Stadium: Subaru Park; Attendance: 17,731; Referee: Daneion Parchment

August 3 Round of 32	Philadelphia Union (United States)	0–0 (5–4 p)	(United States) D.C. United	Chester, Pennsylvania
8:00 pm ET	Gazdag (yellow card) 67'; Mbaizo (yellow card) 73'; Elliott (yellow card) 88'	Report		Stadium: Subaru Park; Attendance: 17,731; Referee: Rosendo Mendoza
	Penalties
	Gazdag (penalty missed); Carranza (penalty scored); Elliott (penalty scored); McGlynn (penalty scored); Bueno (penalty scored); Mbaizo (penalty scored)		(penalty scored) Benteke; (penalty scored) Klich; (penalty scored) Williams; (penalty missed) Durkin; (penalty scored) Davis; (penalty missed) Santos

August 8 Round of 16	Philadelphia Union (United States)	1–1 (4–3 p)	(United States) New York Red Bulls	Chester, Pennsylvania
8:00 pm ET	Harriel 68'; Wagner (yellow card) 75'; Martínez (yellow card) 79'; Mbaizo (yellow card) 82'; Bueno (yellow card) 90+4'	Report	Manoel 4'; Amaya (yellow card) 79'	Stadium: Subaru Park; Attendance: 17,731; Referee: Víctor Alfonso Cáceres Hernández
	Penalties
	Elliott (penalty scored); Uhre (penalty scored); McGlynn (penalty missed); Carranza (penalty scored); Bueno (penalty scored)		(penalty missed) Morgan; (penalty scored) Amaya; (penalty missed) Edelman; (penalty scored) S. Nealis; (penalty scored) Tolkin
Note: Postponed from August 7 at 7:30 pm ET due to thunderstorm forecast in the area.

August 11 Quarterfinals	Philadelphia Union (United States)	2–1	(Mexico) Querétaro	Chester, Pennsylvania
9:09 pm ET	Bueno 10'; Martínez (yellow card) 48'; Donovan 90+11'	Report	Manzanarez (yellow card) 50'; Sepúlveda 65', (yellow card) 90+9'; Mendoza (yellow card) 77' (yellow-red card) 90+7'; García (yellow card) 86'; Gularte (yellow card) 90'	Stadium: Subaru Park; Attendance: 17,731; Referee: Mario Escobar
Note: Match delayed from 8:00 pm to 9:09 pm due to a power outage at Subaru Park.

August 15 Semifinals	Philadelphia Union (United States)	1–4	(United States) Inter Miami CF	Chester, Pennsylvania
8:00 pm ET	Lowe (yellow card) 20'; Bueno (yellow card) 25'; Bedoya 73'	Report	Martínez 3'; Messi 20'; Alba 45+3'; Yedlin (yellow card) 62'; Ruiz 84'	Stadium: Subaru Park; Attendance: 19,778; Referee: Daniel Quintero Huitrón

August 19 Third Place	Philadelphia Union (United States)	3–0	(Mexico) Monterrey	Chester, Pennsylvania
6:00 pm ET	Bueno 1'; Uhre 45+2'; Bedoya 69'	Report	Parra (yellow card) 9'	Stadium: Subaru Park; Attendance: 19,778; Referee: Juan Calderón
