= 2024 Philadelphia Union season =

Philadelphia Union
2024 season
- Sporting Director: Ernst Tanner
- Head coach: Jim Curtin
- Stadium: Subaru Park (Capacity: 18,500)
- MLS: Conference: 12th Overall: 23rd
- MLS Cup Playoffs: Did not qualify
- CONCACAF Champions Cup: Round of 16
- Leagues Cup: 4th Place
- Average home league attendance: 18,845
| Home colors | Away colors |

The 2024 Philadelphia Union season was the club's fifteenth season in Major League Soccer, the top flight of American soccer. The team is managed by Jim Curtin, his eleventh season with the club. The club's regular season began on February 20, 2024, opening with the 2024 CONCACAF Champions Cup after earning its berth by placing third in the 2023 Leagues Cup.

== Competitions ==
=== Major League Soccer ===
==== Standings ====
===== Eastern Conference =====
MLS Eastern Conference table (2024)
| Pos | Team | Pld | W | L | T | GF | GA | GD | Pts |
|---|---|---|---|---|---|---|---|---|---|
| 10 | D.C. United | 34 | 10 | 14 | 10 | 52 | 70 | −18 | 40 |
| 11 | Toronto FC | 34 | 11 | 19 | 4 | 40 | 61 | −21 | 37 |
| 12 | Philadelphia Union | 34 | 9 | 15 | 10 | 62 | 55 | +7 | 37 |
| 13 | Nashville SC | 34 | 9 | 16 | 9 | 38 | 54 | −16 | 36 |
| 14 | New England Revolution | 34 | 9 | 21 | 4 | 37 | 74 | −37 | 31 |

Source: MLS
Rules for classification: 1) points; 2) total wins; 3) total goal differential; 4) total goals scored; 5) fewer disciplinary points; 6) away goal differential; 7) away goals scored; 8) home goals differential; 9) home goals scored; 10) coin toss (2 clubs tied) or drawing of lots (≥3 clubs tied)

===== Overall =====
Overall MLS standings table
| Pos | Team | Pld | W | L | T | GF | GA | GD | Pts | Qualification |
|---|---|---|---|---|---|---|---|---|---|---|
| 21 | D.C. United | 34 | 10 | 14 | 10 | 52 | 70 | −18 | 40 | Qualification for the U.S. Open Cup Round of 32 (Note: As one of the U.S. teams who did not qualify for the 2025 CONCACAF Champions Cup or the 2025 Leagues Cup) |
| 22 | Toronto FC | 34 | 11 | 19 | 4 | 40 | 61 | −21 | 37 | |
| 23 | Philadelphia Union | 34 | 9 | 15 | 10 | 62 | 55 | +7 | 37 | Qualification for the U.S. Open Cup Round of 32 |
| 24 | St. Louis City SC | 34 | 8 | 13 | 13 | 50 | 63 | −13 | 37 | Qualification for the U.S. Open Cup Round of 32 |
| 25 | Nashville SC | 34 | 9 | 16 | 9 | 38 | 54 | −16 | 36 | Qualification for the U.S. Open Cup Round of 32 |

Source: MLS
Rules for classification: 1) points; 2) total wins; 3) total goal differential; 4) total goals scored; 5) fewer disciplinary points; 6) away goal differential; 7) away goals scored; 8) home goals differential; 9) home goals scored; 10) coin toss (2 clubs tied) or drawing of lots (≥3 clubs tied)

==== Match results ====
| February 24 1 | Philadelphia Union | 2–2 | Chicago Fire FC | Chester, Pennsylvania |
| 7:30 p.m. EST | Uhre 55'; Martínez (yellow card) 85'; Gazdag 90+2' | Report | Gutiérrez 39'; Pineda (yellow card) 45'; Brady (yellow card) 69'; Herbers 81' | Stadium: Subaru Park; Attendance: 18,734; Referee: Muhammad Hassan |

| March 2 2 | Sporting Kansas City | 1–1 | Philadelphia Union | Kansas City, Kansas |
| 8:30 p.m. EST | Walter 19'; Russell (yellow card) 90+3' | Report | Bedoya (yellow card) 49', (goal) 90+5'; Lowe (yellow card) 58' | Stadium: Children's Mercy Park; Attendance: 19,942; Referee: Rafael Bonilla |

| March 16 4 | Austin FC | 2–2 | Philadelphia Union | Austin, Texas |
| 8:30 p.m. EDT | Biro (yellow card) 45+6'; Rubio 56', (yellow card) 57'; Gallagher 58'; Cascante (yellow card) 67' | Report | Gazdag 14', (yellow card) 81'; Sullivan (yellow card) 34'; Carranza (yellow card) 45+6'; Martínez (yellow card) 62'; Uhre 65'; Elliott (yellow card) 70'; Lowe (yellow card) 87' | Stadium: Q2 Stadium; Attendance: 20,738; Referee: Wesley Costa |

| March 23 5 | Portland Timbers | 1–3 | Philadelphia Union | Portland, Oregon |
| 10:30 p.m. EDT | Chará (yellow card) 25'; Rodríguez 80' | Report | Carranza 28', 67'; Sullivan (yellow card) 32', (goal) 58'; Elliott (yellow card) 40'; Semmle (yellow card) 88' | Stadium: Providence Park; Attendance: 23,046; Referee: Cristian Campo Hernandez |

| March 30 6 | Philadelphia Union | 2–0 | Minnesota United FC | Chester, Pennsylvania |
| 2:00 p.m. EDT | Gazdag 16'; Martínez (yellow card) 64'; Carranza 84'; Harriel (yellow card) 90+5' | Report | Dotson (yellow card) 69' | Stadium: Subaru Park; Attendance: 19,047; Referee: Sergii Boiko |

| April 6 7 | Nashville SC | 1–2 | Philadelphia Union | Nashville, Tennessee |
| 8:30 p.m. EDT | Surridge 42'; Godoy (yellow card) 84' | Report | Carranza 62'; Gazdag 90' | Stadium: Geodis Park; Attendance: 27,739; Referee: Victor Rivas |

| April 14 8 | Atlanta United FC | 2–2 | Philadelphia Union | Atlanta, Georgia |
| 2:30 p.m. EDT | Almada (yellow card) 25'; Ríos 55'; Wiley 63'; Muyumba (yellow card) 84' | Report | Carranza (yellow card) 21'; Martínez (yellow card) 35'; Gazdag (yellow card) 35'; Uhre 73'; Wagner (yellow card) 75', (goal) 77'; McGlynn (yellow card) 90+5'; Bedoya (yellow card) 91' | Stadium: Mercedes-Benz Stadium; Attendance: 42,763; Referee: Jon Freemon |

| April 27 9 | Philadelphia Union | 1–2 | Real Salt Lake | Chester, Pennsylvania |
| 7:30 p.m. EDT | Gazdag 50'; Glesnes (yellow card) 57'; Carranza (yellow card) 78'; Bedoya (yellow card) 90+8' | Report | Gómez 34', (yellow card) 75'; Arango (yellow card) 39'; Katranis (yellow card) 49', (goal) 89'; Vera (yellow card) 57'; Crooks (yellow card) 59' | Stadium: Subaru Park; Attendance: 19,048; Referee: Malik Badawi |

| April 30 3 | Philadelphia Union | 2–3 | Seattle Sounders FC | Chester, Pennsylvania |
| 7:30 p.m. EST | McGlynn 56'; Uhre (yellow card) 45+10'; Gazdag 57' | Report | Ruidíaz 13', 37' (pen.); Vargas 22'; Ragen (yellow card) 27'; Nouhou (yellow card) 59' | Stadium: Subaru Park; Attendance: 18,525; Referee: Joe Dickerson |
Note: Match entered a weather delay in the 6th minute and was later postponed from March 9 to April 30.

| May 5 10 | D.C. United | 2–2 | Philadelphia Union | Washington, D.C. |
| 7:30 p.m. EDT | Dájome 9'; Murrell 33'; Ku-DiPietro (yellow card) 90+2' | Report | Carranza (yellow card) 20'; Bedoya 42'; Flach (yellow card) 45+2'; Lowe (yellow card) 45+2'; McGlynn 79' | Stadium: Audi Field; Attendance: 17,237; Referee: Ismir Pekmic |

| May 11 11 | Philadelphia Union | 2–3 | Orlando City SC | Chester, Pennsylvania |
| 7:30 p.m. EDT | Uhre 12'; Gazdag 66'; Lowe (yellow card) 81' | Report | McGuire 21', (yellow card) 90'; Muriel 42', 46'; Angulo (yellow card) 45+5'; Araújo (yellow card) 87' | Stadium: Subaru Park; Attendance: 19,028; Referee: Timothy Ford |

| May 15 12 | Philadelphia Union | 1–2 | New York City FC | Chester, Pennsylvania |
| 7:30 p.m. EDT | Wagner (yellow card) 45'; Carranza 47'; Elliott (yellow card) 71' | Report | Martínez 2'; Wolf 45+2'; Rodríguez (yellow card) 51'; Ojeda (yellow card) 62'; Perea (yellow card) 78'; Bakrar (yellow card) 87'; Jones (yellow card) 90' | Stadium: Subaru Park; Attendance: 18,531; Referee: Tori Penso |

| May 18 13 | New England Revolution | 0–3 | Philadelphia Union | Foxborough, Massachusetts |
| 7:30 p.m. EDT | Spaulding (red card) 14'; Kessler (yellow card) 17'; Vrioni (yellow card) 66'; Arreaga (yellow card) 85' | Report | Harriel (yellow card) 30'; Carranza 38'; Gazdag 47', 80' | Stadium: Gillette Stadium; Attendance: 34,947; Referee: Filip Dujic |

| May 25 14 | Charlotte FC | 0–0 | Philadelphia Union | Charlotte, North Carolina |
| 7:30 p.m. EDT | | Report | McGlynn (yellow card) 25'; Harriel (yellow card) 65' | Stadium: Bank of America Stadium; Attendance: 32,232; Referee: Guido Gonzales, Jr. |

| May 29 15 | Philadelphia Union | 0–0 | Toronto FC | Chester, Pennsylvania |
| 7:30 p.m. EDT | Bedoya (yellow card) 25' | Report | Longstaff (yellow card) 87'; Spicer (yellow card) 90+3' | Stadium: Subaru Park; Attendance: 18,535; Referee: Rubiel Vazquez |

| June 1 16 | Philadelphia Union | 2–2 | CF Montréal | Chester, Pennsylvania |
| 7:30 p.m. EDT | Gazdag (yellow card) 39', (goal) 56'; Uhre 58'; Elliott (red card) 63' | Report | Ibrahim 1'; Campbell (yellow card) 28'; Yankov (yellow card) 41'; Lassiter (red card) 45'; Piette 66' | Stadium: Subaru Park; Attendance: 19,026; Referee: Ted Unkel |

| June 15 17 | Philadelphia Union | 1–2 | Inter Miami CF | Chester, Pennsylvania |
| 7:30 p.m. EDT | Uhre 3'; Bedoya (yellow card) 34'; Wagner (yellow card) 64'; Flach (yellow card) 82' | Report | Ruiz (yellow card) 32' (yellow-red card) 69'; Gressel 47'; Avilés (yellow card) 66' (yellow-red card) 84'; Campana (yellow card) 75'; Alba (yellow card) 82'; Afonso 90+4' | Stadium: Subaru Park; Attendance: 19,513; Referee: Ismir Pekmic |

| June 19 18 | FC Cincinnati | 4–3 | Philadelphia Union | Cincinnati, Ohio |
| 7:30 p.m. EDT | Keller (yellow card) 6'; Kelsy 29'; Acosta 49', 90+10'; Orellano 60' | Report | Elliott (yellow card) 12'; Wagner (yellow card) 12'; Baribo 43', 90+1'; Bueno 55'; McGlynn (yellow card) 81' | Stadium: TQL Stadium; Attendance: 24,795; Referee: Jair Marrufo |

| June 22 19 | Philadelphia Union | 0–2 | Charlotte FC | Chester, Pennsylvania |
| 7:30 p.m. EDT | | Report | Agyemang 56', 63'; Bender (yellow card) 68'; Diani (yellow card) 87'; Westwood (yellow card) 90+9' | Stadium: Subaru Park; Attendance: 18,762; Referee: Alexis Da Silva |

| June 29 20 | CF Montréal | 4–2 | Philadelphia Union | Montreal, Quebec |
| 7:30 p.m. EDT | Martínez 36'; Duke 56'; Iankov 89'; Ruan 90+2', (yellow card) 90+3' | Report | Sullivan 29'; Bueno 41'; Glesnes (yellow card) 90+5' | Stadium: Saputo Stadium; Attendance: 19,619; Referee: Jon Freemon |

| July 3 21 | Chicago Fire FC | 4–3 | Philadelphia Union | Chicago, Illinois |
| 8:30 p.m. EDT | Omsberg (yellow card) 4'; Haile-Selassie 30'; Brady (yellow card) 45+7'; Cuypers 82', 90+2'; Giménez 89' | Report | Glesnes (yellow card) 32'; Donovan 38'; Gazdag 45+7' (pen.), (yellow card) 54'; McGlynn 49' | Stadium: Soldier Field; Attendance: 19,453; Referee: Abdou Ndiaye |

| July 6 22 | Philadelphia Union | 0–0 | New York Red Bulls | Chester, Pennsylvania |
| 7:30 p.m. EDT | Bedoya (yellow card) 86' | Report | Edelman (yellow card) 45+2' | Stadium: Subaru Park; Referee: Filip Dujic |

| July 13 23 | Toronto FC | 2–1 | Philadelphia Union | Toronto, Ontario |
| 7:30 p.m. EDT | Elliott 74' (o.g.); Kerr 78' | Report | Baribo 39'; Sullivan (yellow card) 77' | Stadium: BMO Field; Attendance: 25,880; Referee: Allen Chapman |

| July 17 24 | Philadelphia Union | 5–1 | New England Revolution | Chester, Pennsylvania |
| 7:30 p.m. EDT | Baribo 29', 44', 52'; Glesnes 39'; Sullivan 84' | Report | Harkes 50'; Panayotou (yellow card) 66' | Stadium: Subaru Park; Attendance: 18,554; Referee: Rubiel Vazquez |

| July 20 25 | Philadelphia Union | 3–0 | Nashville SC | Chester, Pennsylvania |
| 7:30 p.m. EDT | Gazdag 10', 38', 89'; Lowe (yellow card) 2'; Uhre (yellow card) 20'; Elliott (yellow card) 61' | Report | Muyl (yellow card) 60'; Bauer (yellow card) 67'; Godoy (yellow card) 76' | Stadium: Subaru Park; Attendance: 18,962; Referee: Chris Penso |

| August 28 26 | Philadelphia Union | 0–1 | Columbus Crew | Chester, Pennsylvania |
| 7:30 p.m. EDT | | Report | Jones (yellow card) 3'; Yeboah 75'; Amundsen (yellow card) 89'; Schulte (yellow card) 90+6' | Stadium: Subaru Park; Attendance: 18,513; Referee: Ismir Pekmic |

| August 31 27 | New York Red Bulls | 0–2 | Philadelphia Union | Harrison, New Jersey |
| 7:30 p.m. EDT | | Report | Uhre 4'; Baribo 14', (yellow card) 55'; Blake (yellow card) 76' | Stadium: Red Bull Arena; Attendance: 19,951; Referee: Jair Marrufo |

| September 14 28 | Inter Miami CF | 3–1 | Philadelphia Union | Fort Lauderdale, Florida |
| 7:30 p.m. EDT | Messi 26', 30', (yellow card) 87'; Avilés (yellow card) 32'; Suárez (yellow card) 75', (goal) 90+8'; Busquets (yellow card) 90+5' | Report | Uhre 2'; Elliott (yellow card) 56'; Sullivan (yellow card) 72' | Stadium: Chase Stadium; Attendance: 20,915; Referee: Sergii Boiko |

| September 18 29 | New York City FC | 1–5 | Philadelphia Union | New York, New York |
| 7:30 p.m. EDT | Martínez 45+5'; Tanasijević (yellow card) 51'; O'Toole (yellow card) 90+3' | Report | Baribo 15'; Uhre 25'; Gazdag 32', (yellow card) 42'; Glesnes 74'; Bueno 85' | Stadium: Yankee Stadium; Attendance: 19,153; Referee: Pierre-Luc Lauziere |

| September 22 30 | Philadelphia Union | 4–0 | D.C. United | Chester, Pennsylvania |
| 6:00 p.m. EDT | Uhre 13'; Gazdag 16', 69'; Baribo 51' | Report | Herrera (yellow card) 25'; Dájome (yellow card) 90+2' | Stadium: Subaru Park; Attendance: 18,823; Referee: Filip Dujic |

| September 28 31 | Philadelphia Union | 1–1 | Atlanta United FC | Chester, Pennsylvania |
| 7:30 p.m. EDT | Harriel 61', (yellow card) 76'; Uhre (yellow card) 69' | Report | Lennon (yellow card) 52'; Lobjanidze 72' | Stadium: Subaru Park; Attendance: 18,837; Referee: Fotis Bazakos |

| October 2 32 | Orlando City SC | 2–1 | Philadelphia Union | Orlando, Florida |
| 7:30 p.m. EDT | Schlegel (yellow card) 19'; Torres 57', (yellow card) 69'; McGuire 64', (yellow card) 90+5'; Araújo (yellow card) 90+2' | Report | Gazdag (yellow card) 68'; Sullivan 72'; Wagner (yellow card) 74'; Uhre (yellow card) 90+1' | Stadium: Inter&Co Stadium; Attendance: 23,027; Referee: Armando Villarreal |

| October 5 33 | Columbus Crew | 3–2 | Philadelphia Union | Columbus, Ohio |
| 7:30 p.m. EDT | Hernández 4', 76'; Herrera (yellow card) 11'; Farsi 41'; Cheberko (yellow card) 90+2' | Report | Harriel 25'; McGlynn 41' | Stadium: Lower.com Field; Attendance: 20,788; Referee: Allen Chapman |

| October 19 34 | Philadelphia Union | 1–2 | FC Cincinnati | Chester, Pennsylvania |
| 6:00 p.m. EDT | Sullivan 2'; Baribo (yellow card) 38'; Elliott (yellow card) 64'; Wagner (yellow card) 80' | Report | Asad 45+4', (yellow card) 66'; Glesnes 46' (o.g.); Nwobodo (yellow card) 59'; Orellano (yellow card) 68' | Stadium: Subaru Park; Attendance: 19,016; Referee: Joe Dickerson |

=== U.S. Open Cup ===
Philadelphia Union was not sent to the tournament, and neither was their MLS Next Pro team Philadelphia Union II due to their participation in the 2024 CONCACAF Champions Cup.

=== CONCACAF Champions Cup ===
==== Round one ====
| February 20 Round one 1st Leg | Saprissa (Costa Rica) | 2–3 | (United States) Philadelphia Union | San José, Costa Rica |
| 10:00 PM EST | Glesnes 28' (o.g.); Sinclair (yellow card) 38'; Taylor 90' | Report | Carranza (yellow card) 38', (goal) 55', 76', 79'; Martínez (yellow card) 38'; Lowe (yellow card) 67'; Wagner (yellow card) 87' | Stadium: Estadio Ricardo Saprissa Aymá; Attendance: 15,955; Referee: Víctor Cáceres Hernández (Mexico) |

| February 27 Round one 2nd Leg | Philadelphia Union (United States) | 3–3 (a.e.t.) (6–5 agg.) | (Costa Rica) Saprissa | Chester, Pennsylvania |
| 8:15 PM EST | Carranza 17'; Sullivan 26'; Mbaizo (yellow card) 40'; Elliott (red card) 90+3'; Uhre 94'; Semmle (yellow card) 102'; Lowe (yellow card) 104'; Bedoya (yellow card) 116' | Report | Paradela 14' (pen.); Madrigal 28'; Torres 62'; Joseph Mora (yellow card) 90+6' | Stadium: Subaru Park; Attendance: 18,513; Referee: Selvin Brown (Honduras) |
Note: Philadelphia Union won 6–5 on aggregate.

==== Round of 16 ====
| March 5 Round of 16 1st Leg | Philadelphia Union (United States) | 0–0 | (Mexico) Pachuca | Chester, Pennsylvania |
| 6:00 PM EST | Mbaizo (yellow card) 61' | Report | Cabral (yellow card) 47' | Stadium: Subaru Park; Attendance: 16,558; Referee: Ismael Cornejo (El Salvador) |

| March 12 Round of 16 2nd Leg | Pachuca (Mexico) | 6–0 (6–0 agg.) | (United States) Philadelphia Union | Pachuca, Mexico |
| 8:15 PM EDT | Rondón 7' (pen.), 45+6', 53'; Pedraza (yellow card) 24'; Suárez 57'; Idrissi 63'; Sánchez (yellow card) 76'; Bautista 85' | Report | Lowe (yellow card) 74' | Stadium: Estadio Hidalgo; Attendance: 19,658; Referee: Bryan López (Guatemala) |
Note: Pachuca won the series 6–0.

=== Leagues Cup ===
==== Group stage (East 4) ====
| Pos | Team | Pld | W | PW | PL | L | GF | GA | GD | Pts | Qualification | PHI | CAZ | CLT |
|---|---|---|---|---|---|---|---|---|---|---|---|---|---|---|
| 1 | (United States Soccer Federation) Philadelphia Union | 2 | 1 | 0 | 1 | 0 | 2 | 1 | +1 | 4 | Advance to knockout stage | — | 1–1 | 1–0 |
| 2 | (Mexican Football Federation) Cruz Azul | 2 | 0 | 1 | 1 | 0 | 1 | 1 | 0 | 3 | Advance to knockout stage | — | — | — |
| 3 | (United States Soccer Federation) Charlotte FC | 2 | 0 | 1 | 0 | 1 | 0 | 1 | −1 | 2 | | — | 0–0 | — |

Source: Leagues Cup
Rules for classification: Tiebreakers

| July 27 Group stage | Philadelphia Union (United States) | 1–0 | (United States) Charlotte FC | Chester, Pennsylvania |
| 8:00 PM EDT | Martínez (yellow card) 1'; Baribo 33'; Gazdag (yellow card) 68'; Bedoya (yellow card) 75' | Report | Smalls (yellow card) 60' | Stadium: Subaru Park; Attendance: 18,514; Referee: Marco Ortiz |

| August 4 Group stage | Philadelphia Union (United States) | 1–1 (3–5 p) | (Mexico) Cruz Azul | Chester, Pennsylvania |
| 8:00 PM EDT | Bedoya (yellow card) 3'; Sullivan (yellow card) 37'; Lowe (yellow card) 55'; Gazdag (yellow card) 59', (goal) 88' | Report | Rotondi 42', (yellow card) 59'; Romo (yellow card) 51'; Antuna (yellow card) 90+2' | Stadium: Subaru Park; Attendance: 18,000; Referee: Jorge Camacho |
| | Penalties |
| | Gazdag (penalty missed); Elliott (penalty scored); Martínez (penalty scored); Adeniran (penalty scored); (penalty missed) (penalty scored) (penalty scored); (penalty scored) | | (penalty scored) Piovi; (penalty scored) Montaño; (penalty scored) Ditta; (penalty scored) Rotondi; (penalty scored) Sepúlveda; (penalty scored) (penalty scored) (penalty scored) (penalty scored); (penalty scored) |

==== Knockout stage ====
| August 9 Round of 32 | Philadelphia Union (United States) | 2–0 | (Canada) CF Montréal | Chester, Pennsylvania |
| 19:30 | Baribo 45+1', 90+6'; Wagner (yellow card) 69'; Mbaizo (yellow card) 87' | Report | | Stadium: Subaru Park; Referee: Daniel Quintero (Mexico) |

| August 13 Round of 16 | FC Cincinnati (United States) | 2–4 | (United States) Philadelphia Union | Cincinnati, Ohio |
| | Robinson (yellow card) 43'; Bucha 66'; Yedlin 80' | Report | Uhre 51'; Baribo 61', 81'; Sullivan 84'; Wagner (yellow card) 90+4' | Stadium: TQL Stadium; Attendance: 15,710; Referee: Rubiel Vazquez |

| August 17 Quarter-finals | Philadelphia Union (United States) | 1–1 (4–3 p) | (Mexico) Mazatlán | Chester, Pennsylvania |
| | Baribo (yellow card) 40' (yellow-red card) 45+1'; Uhre 45+3'; Glesnes (yellow card) 58' | Report | Colula (yellow card) 31'; Bárcenas (yellow card) 45+9'; Escoboza 59'; Rubio (yellow card) 63'; Almada (yellow card) 79' | Stadium: Subaru Park; Referee: Selvin Brown (Honduras) |
| | Penalties |
| | Martínez (penalty scored); Elliott (penalty scored); Lowe (penalty scored); Adeniran (penalty missed); Bueno (penalty scored) | | (penalty missed) Colman; (penalty scored) Árciga; (penalty missed) Torres; (penalty scored) Escoboza; (penalty scored) Camacho |

| August 21 Semi-finals | Columbus Crew (United States) | 3–1 | (United States) Philadelphia Union | Columbus, Ohio |
| TBD EDT | Rossi 12', 43'; Zawadzki (yellow card) 49'; Hernández 53' | Report | Gazdag 32'; Bueno (yellow card) 90+1' | Stadium: Lower.com Field; Attendance: 12,784; Referee: Armando Villarreal |

| August 25 3rd | Philadelphia Union (United States) | 2–2 (1–3 p) | (United States) Colorado Rapids | Chester, Pennsylvania |
| 4:30 p.m. EST | Wagner (yellow card) 26'; Baribo 41', 44' | Report | Maxsø (yellow card) 25'; Harris 38'; Larraz 49' | Stadium: Subaru Park; Attendance: 8,417; Referee: Fernando Guerrero |
| | Penalties |
| | Gazdag (penalty missed); Baribo (penalty missed); Elliott (penalty scored); Mbaizo (penalty missed) | | (penalty scored) Mihailovic; (penalty scored) Bassett; (penalty scored) Maxsø; (penalty missed) Ronan |
