= Riasco =

Riasco is a surname. Notable people with the surname include:

- José Riasco (born 2004), Venezuelan footballer
- Rigoberto Riasco (1953–2022), Panamanian boxer
