= Holden Trent =

American soccer player (1999–2024)

Personal information
- Date of birth: July 7, 1999
- Place of birth: Greensboro, North Carolina, United States
- Date of death: October 26, 2024 (aged 25)
- Place of death: Greensboro, North Carolina, United States
- Height: 1.88 m (6 ft 2 in)
- Position: Goalkeeper

Youth career
- North Carolina Fusion
- Carolina Rapids

College career
Years	Team	Apps	(Gls)
2018–2022	High Point Panthers	52	(0)

Senior career*
Years	Team	Apps	(Gls)
2018–2019	North Carolina Fusion U23 (Note: Carolina Dynamo was renamed North Carolina Fusion U23 in 2019)	10	(0)
2021	Des Moines Menace	2	(0)
2022	South Georgia Tormenta FC 2	3	(0)
2023–2024	Philadelphia Union	0	(0)
2023–2024	→ Philadelphia Union II (loan)	6	(0)
Total		21	(0)
- * Club domestic league appearances and goals

Holden Trent (July 7, 1999 – October 26, 2024) was an American soccer player who played as a goalkeeper.

== Early life ==
Trent was born Greensboro, North Carolina, on July 7, 1999. He played youth soccer with the North Carolina Fusion and the Carolina Rapids.

== College career ==
In 2017, Trent attended West Virginia University, but did not play with the soccer team.

In 2018, he began attending High Point University, where he played for the men's soccer team. He redshirted his freshman season. Over his time at High Point, he was named the Big South Conference Defensive Player of the Week seven times, Big South All-Conference First Team three times, the 2022 Big South All-Tournament Team, and 2022 All-South Region Team. He was also named the South Region Goalkeeper of the Year in 2021 and 2022.

== Club career ==
In 2018, Trent played with the Carolina Dynamo (later re-named North Carolina Fusion U23) in the Premier Development League. He continued with the team in 2019.

In 2021, he joined the Des Moines Menace in USL League Two. In 2022, he played with South Georgia Tormenta FC 2.

At the 2023 MLS SuperDraft, Trent was selected in the first round (28th overall) by the Philadelphia Union. In February 2023, he signed a one-year contract with club options from 2024 through 2026 with the club. At the end of the 2023 season, the club picked up his option for the 2024 season. During his time with the Union, he made six appearances on loan with the second team in MLS Next Pro.

== Death ==
On October 23, 2024, Trent's family announced that he had been hospitalized. On October 26, 2024, he died at the age of 25. It was later announced that just prior to his death, he made the decision to become a registered organ donor.

Following his death, his family launched the Holden Trent Goal 13 Foundation, an organization to honor his legacy by helping other athletes and the Holden Trent Soccer Scholarship was created at High Point University that will be awarded to a first generation player on the school soccer team who demonstrates leadership and dedication to the sport.

== Career statistics ==
Appearances and goals by club, season and competition
Club	Season	League			Playoffs		National cup		Other		Total	
Club	Season	Division	Apps	Goals	Apps	Goals	Apps	Goals	Apps	Goals	Apps	Goals
North Carolina Fusion U23	2018	Premier Development League	9	0	–		–		–		9	0
North Carolina Fusion U23	2019	USL League Two	1	0	0	0	–		–		1	0
North Carolina Fusion U23	Total		10	0	0	0	0	0	0	0	10	0
Des Moines Menace	2021	USL League Two	2	0	0	0	–		–		2	0
South Georgia Tormenta FC 2	2022	USL League Two	3	0	–		–		–		3	0
Philadelphia Union	2023	Major League Soccer	0	0	0	0	0	0	0	0	0	0
Philadelphia Union	2024	Major League Soccer	0	0	–		–		0	0	0	0
Philadelphia Union	Total		0	0	0	0	0	0	0	0	0	0
Philadelphia Union II (loan)	2023	MLS Next Pro	5	0	0	0	–		–		5	0
Philadelphia Union II (loan)	2024	MLS Next Pro	1	0	0	0	–		–		1	0
Philadelphia Union II (loan)	Total		6	0	0	0	0	0	0	0	6	0
Career total			21	0	0	0	0	0	0	0	21	0
