= Damion Lowe =

Jamaican footballer (born 1993)

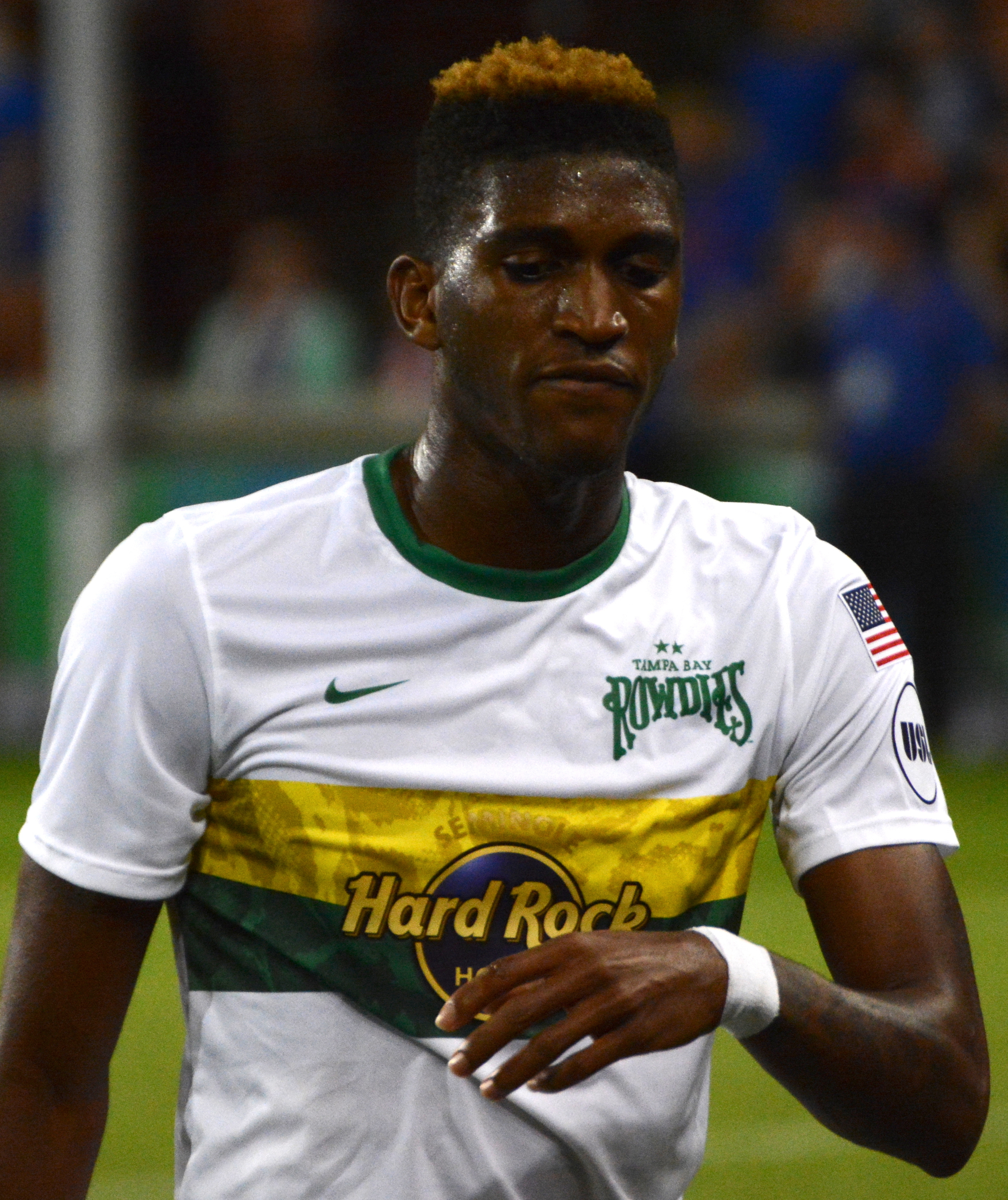
- Lowe with the Tampa Bay Rowdies in 2017

Personal information
- Full name: Damion Onandi Lowe
- Date of birth: 5 May 1993 (age 33)
- Place of birth: Kingston, Jamaica
- Height: 1.91 m (6 ft 3 in)
- Position: Centre-back

Team information
- Current team: Dewa United Banten
- Number: 17

Youth career
- Harbour View

College career
Years	Team	Apps	(Gls)
2011–2013	Hartford Hawks	44	(8)

Senior career*
Years	Team	Apps	(Gls)
2013	Reading United	10	(1)
2014–2016	Seattle Sounders	0	(0)
2015	→ Seattle Sounders 2	17	(1)
2016	→ Minnesota United (loan)	27	(2)
2017	Tampa Bay Rowdies	16	(1)
2017–2020	Start	50	(2)
2020	Phoenix Rising	2	(0)
2020–2022	Al Ittihad	30	(2)
2022	Inter Miami	28	(1)
2023–2024	Philadelphia Union	32	(2)
2024–2025	Al-Okhdood	22	(0)
2025	Houston Dynamo	0	(0)
2026–	Dewa United Banten	15	(0)

International career^{‡}
2013	Jamaica U20	3	(1)
2016–	Jamaica	85	(4)
Medal record
Men's football
Representing Jamaica
CONCACAF Gold Cup
Runner-up	2017 United States	Team
CONCACAF Nations League
Bronze medal – third place	2024 United States	Team
- * Club domestic league appearances and goals as of 20 September 2026 ‡ National team caps and goals as of 5 October 2026

Damion Onandi Lowe (born 5 May 1993) is a Jamaican professional footballer who plays as a centre-back for Super League club Dewa United Banten and the Jamaica national team.

== Early life ==
Born in Kingston, Jamaica, Damion Lowe is the son of former Jamaican international Onandi Lowe. Damion attended Camperdown High School in Kingston and played youth soccer for Jamaican club Harbour View.

In 2011, Lowe started attending the University of Hartford. While playing three season for the Hartford Hawks, Lowe was named to the America East All-Tournament Team in his first season and in his final year for the Hawks, he was named to the Second Team All-Northeast region, First Team All-America East, and All-America East Tournament Team. In three years, Lowe played 44 games, scoring 8 goals and assisting 3 more.

== Club career ==
=== Reading United ===
Playing in the PDL, Lowe appeared in 10 regular season matches, scoring once while helping Reading allow a division best 12 goals in 14 games. Lowe was also named to the PDL best 11 and started two games for Reading in the 2013 Lamar Hunt U.S. Open Cup.

=== Seattle Sounders FC ===
Lowe signed a Generation Adidas deal with Major League Soccer. The Jamaican defender was selected eight overall in the 2014 MLS SuperDraft by the Seattle Sounders FC, making him the third Jamaican to be selected in the Draft, behind Andre Blake and Andre Lewis.

=== Minnesota United ===
Lowe was sent on a season long loan to Minnesota United Where he led their defense line and was nominated for the NASL young player of the year award.

=== IK Start ===
In August 2017, Lowe transferred to IK Start. His contract was terminated on 15 May 2020.

=== Phoenix Rising ===
Lowe was signed by USL Championship side Phoenix Rising on 16 September 2020.

=== Al Ittihad ===
Lowe signed a two-year contract with Egyptian Premier League side Al Ittihad Alexandria on 28 November 2020. In the 2020–21 season, he made 27 league appearances, scoring one goal. On 9 January 2022, Lowe terminated his contract with Al Ittihad after making only three appearances that season.

=== Inter Miami ===
On 16 January 2022, Lowe returned to the United States, signing a two-year deal with MLS club Inter Miami CF.

=== Philadelphia Union ===
On 25 January 2023, Lowe was traded to Philadelphia Union in exchange for $225,000 in General Allocation Money and a 2024 MLS SuperDraft natural first round draft pick.

=== Al-Okhdood ===
On 27 August 2024, Lowe joined Al-Okhdood on a one-year contract.

=== Houston Dynamo ===
On 2 September 2025, Lowe returned to the United States to join Houston Dynamo until the end of their 2025 season, but failed to make an appearance. On 21 October, the team announced that they had declined his contract option.

== International career ==
Lowe represented the Jamaica National Team at the 2013 CONCACAF U-20 Championship and also in the U-23 Olympic Qualifying. Lowe made his senior international debut on 11 October 2016 versus Guyana.

== Career statistics ==
=== Club ===
As of match played 20 September 2026

Appearances and goals by club, season and competition
Club	Season	League			National cup		Continental		Other		Total	
Club	Season	Division	Apps	Goals	Apps	Goals	Apps	Goals	Apps	Goals	Apps	Goals
Reading United	2023	USL Premier Development League	10	0	1	0	—		—		11	0
Seattle Sounders FC U-23	2014	USL Premier Development League	2	0	0	0	—		—		2	0
Seattle Sounders FC 2	2015	United Soccer League	17	1	2	0	—		1 (Note: Appearance in the 2015 USL Playoffs)	0	20	1
Minnesota United FC (loan)	2016	North American Soccer League	27	2	2	0	—		—		29	2
Tampa Bay Rowdies	2017	United Soccer League	16	1	2	0	—		—		18	1
Start	2017	Norwegian First Division	5	0	0	0	—		—		5	0
Start	2018	Eliteserien	23	1	4	1	—		—		27	2
Start	2019	Norwegian First Division	22	1	0	0	—		3 (Note: Appearances in the 2019 Norwegian First Division Relegation play-offs)	1	25	2
Start	Totals		50	2	4	1	—		3	1	57	4
Phoenix Rising FC	2020	USL Championship	2	0	0	0	—		3 (Note: Appearances in the 2020 USL Championship Playoffs)	0	5	0
Al Ittihad	2019–20	Egyptian Premier League	0	0	1	0	—		—		1	0
Al Ittihad	2020–21	Egyptian Premier League	27	1	1	0	—		—		28	1
Al Ittihad	2021–22	Egyptian Premier League	3	1	0	0	—		—		3	1
Al Ittihad	Total		30	2	2	0	0	0	0	0	32	2
Inter Miami CF	2022	Major League Soccer	28	1	2	0	—		1 (Note: Appearance in the 2022 MLS Cup Playoffs)	0	31	1
Philadelphia Union	2023	Major League Soccer	20	2	1	0	3 (Note: Appearances in the CONCACAF Champions League)	1	9 (Note: Appearances in the 2023 MLS Cup Playoffs and Leagues Cup)	0	33	3
Philadelphia Union	2024	Major League Soccer	12	0	0	0	3	0	2 (Note: Appearances in the Leagues Cup)	0	17	0
Philadelphia Union	Total		32	2	1	0	6	0	2	0	50	5
Al-Okhdood	2024–25	Saudi Pro League	22	0	1	0	—		—		23	0
Houston Dynamo	2025	Major League Soccer	0	0	0	0	—		0	0	0	0
Dewa United Banten	2025–26	Super League	11	0	0	0	2 (Note: Appearances in AFC Challenge League)	2	—		13	2
Dewa United Banten	2026–27	Super League	4	0	0	0	0	0	0	0	4	0
Dewa United Banten	Total		15	0	0	0	2	2	0	0	17	2
Career totals			251	11	17	1	8	3	11	1	288	16

=== International ===
As of match played 5 October 2026

Appearances and goals by national team and year
National team	Year	Apps	Goals
Jamaica	2016	2	0
Jamaica	2017	11	1
Jamaica	2018	4	0
Jamaica	2019	12	1
Jamaica	2020	2	0
Jamaica	2021	11	0
Jamaica	2022	9	0
Jamaica	2023	9	1
Jamaica	2024	11	0
Jamaica	2025	7	1
Jamaica	2026	6	0
Total		84	4

Scores and results list Jamaica's goal tally first.

List of internarional goals scored by Damion Lowe
No.	Date	Venue	Opponent	Score	Result	Competition
1.	16 February 2017	BBVA Compass Stadium, Houston, United States	Honduras	1–0	1–0	Friendly
2.	17 June 2019	Independence Park, Kingston, Jamaica	Honduras	3–1	3–2	2019 CONCACAF Gold Cup
3.	24 June 2023	Soldier Field, Chicago, United States	United States	1–0	1–1	2023 CONCACAF Gold Cup
4.	6 September 2025	Bermuda National Stadium, Hamilton, Bermuda	Bermuda	1–0	4–0	2026 FIFA World Cup qualification

== Honours ==
Seattle Sounders

- MLS Cup: 2016
- Supporters' Shield: 2014
- U.S. Open Cup: 2014

Phoenix Rising

- Western Conference (playoffs): 2020

Jamaica

- Caribbean Cup runner-up: 2017
- CONCACAF Gold Cup runner-up: 2017

Individual

- CONCACAF Gold Cup Best XI: 2021
