= Alejandro Bedoya =

American soccer player (born 1987)

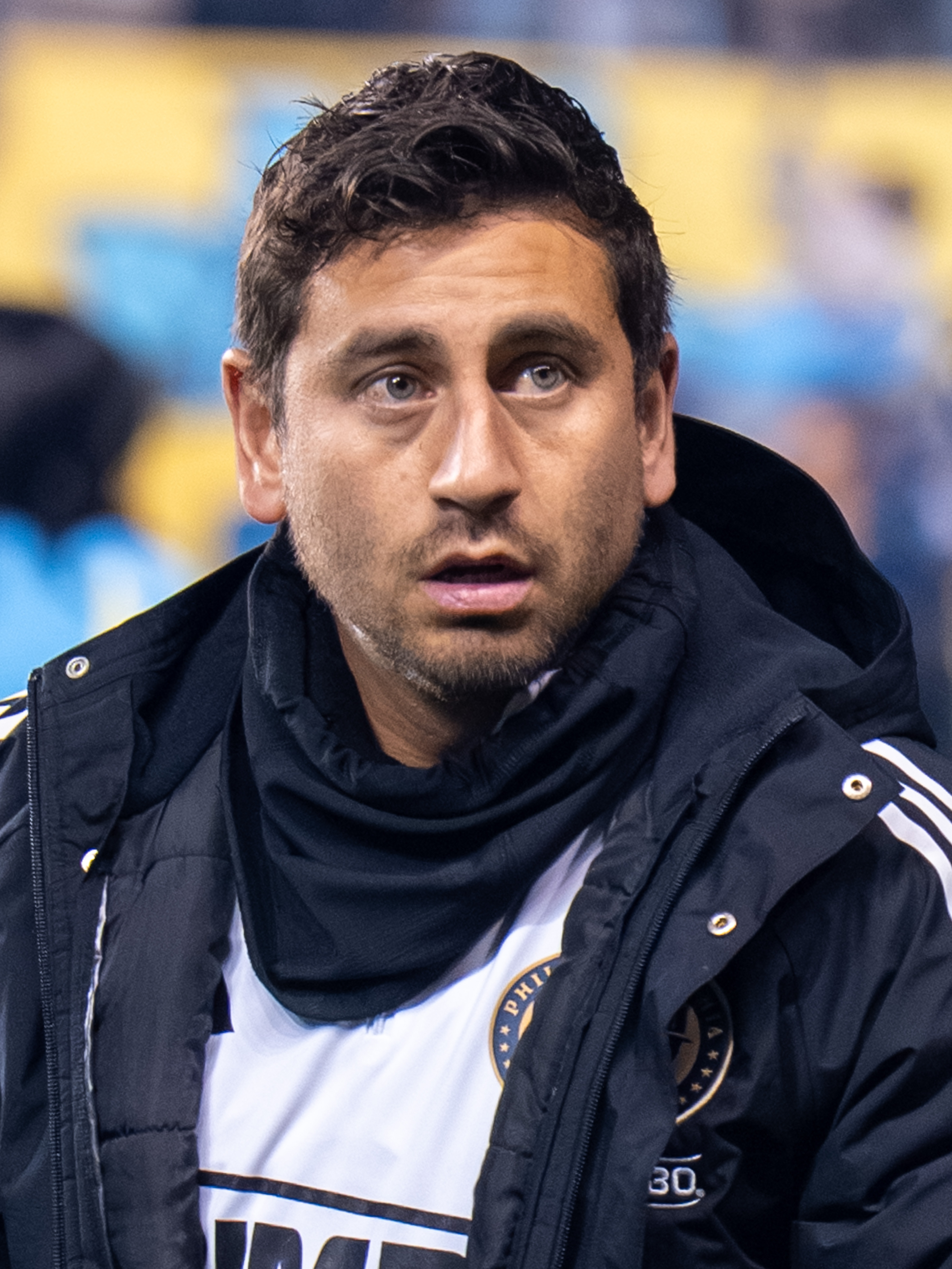
- Bedoya with the Philadelphia Union in 2025

Personal information
- Full name: Alejandro Bedoya
- Date of birth: April 29, 1987 (age 39)
- Place of birth: Englewood, New Jersey, United States
- Height: 5 ft 11 in (1.80 m)
- Position: Midfielder

Team information
- Current team: Philadelphia Union
- Number: 11

Youth career
- AYSO
- 2001–2003: FUTSOC

College career
Years	Team	Apps	(Gls)
2005–2006	Fairleigh Dickinson Knights	35	(13)
2007–2008	Boston College Eagles	37	(14)

Senior career*
Years	Team	Apps	(Gls)
2009–2011	Örebro SK	65	(8)
2011–2012	Rangers	12	(1)
2012–2013	Helsingborgs IF	21	(6)
2013–2016	Nantes	87	(11)
2016–	Philadelphia Union	288	(25)

International career^{‡}
2010–2017	United States	66	(2)
Medal record
Representing United States
Winner	CONCACAF Gold Cup	2013
Runner-up	CONCACAF Gold Cup	2011
Men's Soccer
- * Club domestic league appearances and goals as of November 7, 2026 ‡ National team caps and goals as of November 14, 2017

Alejandro Bedoya (born April 29, 1987) is an American professional soccer player who played as a midfielder for the Philadelphia Union of Major League Soccer, and serves as their captain. On November 2, 2026, Bedoya announced that he would retire from professional soccer after the Union's 2026 season, ending a 17-year professional career.

== Early life ==
Bedoya, of Colombian descent, was born in New Jersey and raised in Weston, Florida, where he played youth soccer for local clubs; the AYSO club: Weston Fury, In high school he won a state championship while playing for St. Thomas Aquinas High School in 2005. His father, Adriano, played professional soccer in Colombia with Millonarios, and his grandfather, Fabio, played for Deportes Quindío.

== Club career ==
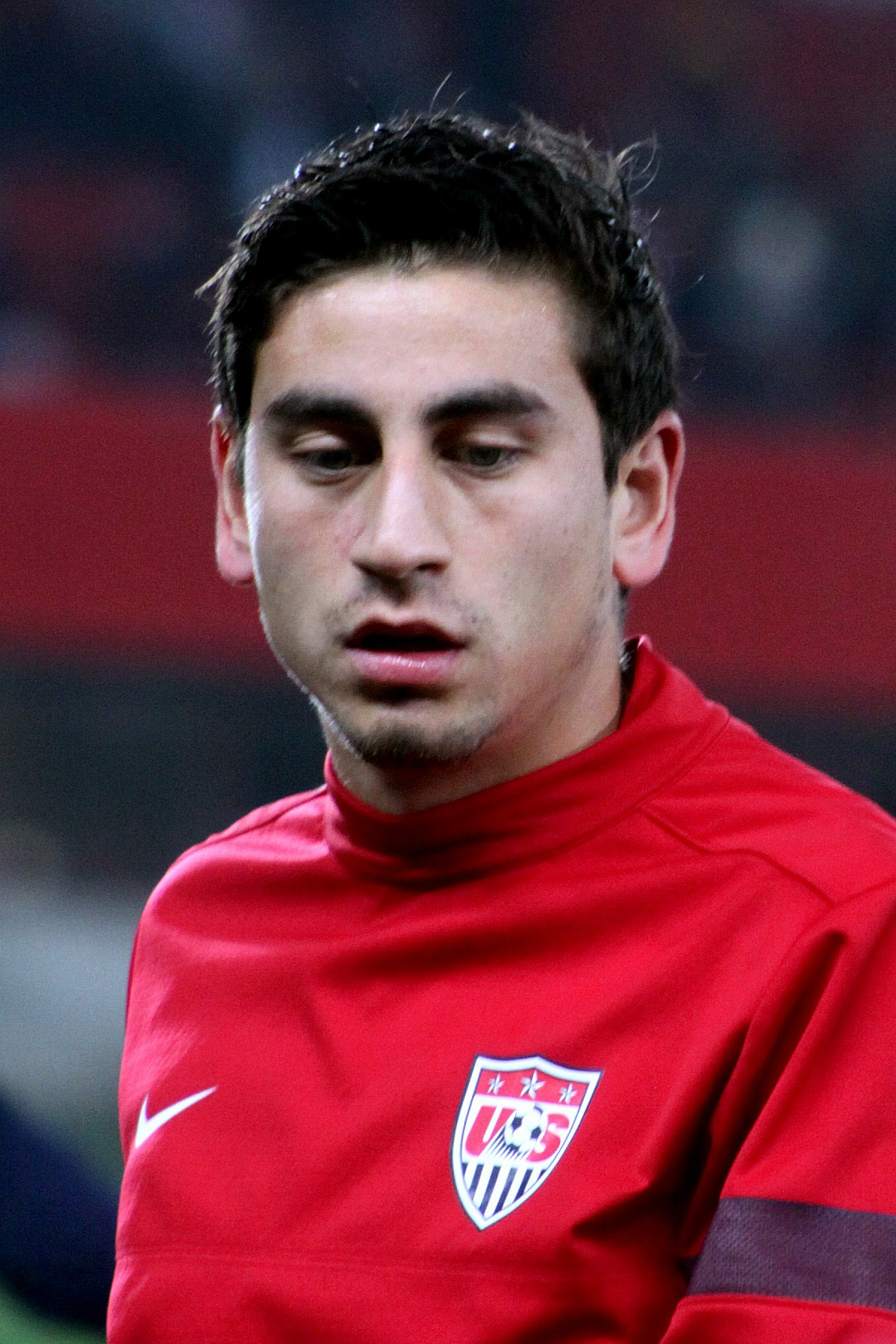
Bedoya in 2013

=== Örebro SK ===
Although college seniors often enter the MLS SuperDraft, Bedoya explored options abroad. In late 2008, he signed a contract with Swedish club Örebro SK and joined the club on January 7, 2009. On April 6, he made his debut for Örebro SK coming on as a substitute in the 73rd minute. He scored his first goal for Örebro SK when he gave the team a 1–0 lead against Assyriska FF in the Svenska Cupen. Over the course of the season, Bedoya worked his way into the starting line-up and became a mainstay at central midfield in Örebro SK 4–3–3 formation. In February 2011, Bedoya was given a trial at English Premier League side Birmingham City, but was not signed.

=== Rangers ===
On July 21, 2011, it was announced that Bedoya had agreed to personal terms with Scottish club Rangers, pending the approval of a work permit, with a view to joining in January 2012, once the Allsvenskan season was finished. However, Örebro SK and Rangers agreed an undisclosed fee on August 17, 2011, allowing him to join Rangers immediately.

Bedoya made his debut as a second-half substitute in a Scottish Premier League match against Aberdeen on August 28, 2011. He scored his first Rangers goal in a 5–0 victory over Dundee United on May 2, 2012, to help secure second place for the Glasgow club.

=== Helsingborgs IF ===
When Rangers entered administration, Bedoya signed a short-term contract with Allsvenskan champions Helsingborgs IF on August 10, 2012. On August 18, 2012, in his debut with the club, Bedoya scored an overhead kick goal in his team's 2–1 loss to Elfsborg. He started both games for Helsingborg in the home-and-away series against Celtic in the UEFA Champions League; the Swedish champions were eliminated on a 4–0 aggregate. Helsingborg were sent into the 2012–13 UEFA Europa League group stage where they finished in third place and Bedoya scored two goals against Hannover 96 and FC Twente. Bedoya received a number of offers after his contract expired with Helsingborg but decided to stay for at least another six months.

=== Nantes ===
On August 7, 2013, Bedoya joined newly promoted Ligue 1 side Nantes. He went on to make his first Ligue 1 appearance for Nantes against reigning champions PSG on August 25, 2013. Bedoya's first goal for the club came in Nantes' 1–0 victory over AC Ajaccio on October 19, 2013, when he scored the only goal three minutes from time to extend the club's winning run to four games in a row. Following the match, his manager, Michel Der Zakarian, praised Bedoya for his intelligent play and technical excellence. Bedoya scored his second goal for the club, and first at Nantes' home ground the Stade de la Beaujoire, on December 3, 2013, notching Nantes' equalizing goal in an eventual 2–1 victory over struggling Valenciennes. Bedoya continued his scoring run on December 6, 2013, netting the game's only goal in Nantes' defeat of Marseille, a result which lifted Nantes into fourth place and caused the sacking of Marseille manager Élie Baup. On February 10, 2016, Bedoya scored the winning goal with a header in the 118th minute for FC Nantes in a Coupe de France match against FC Girondins de Bordeaux.

=== Philadelphia Union ===
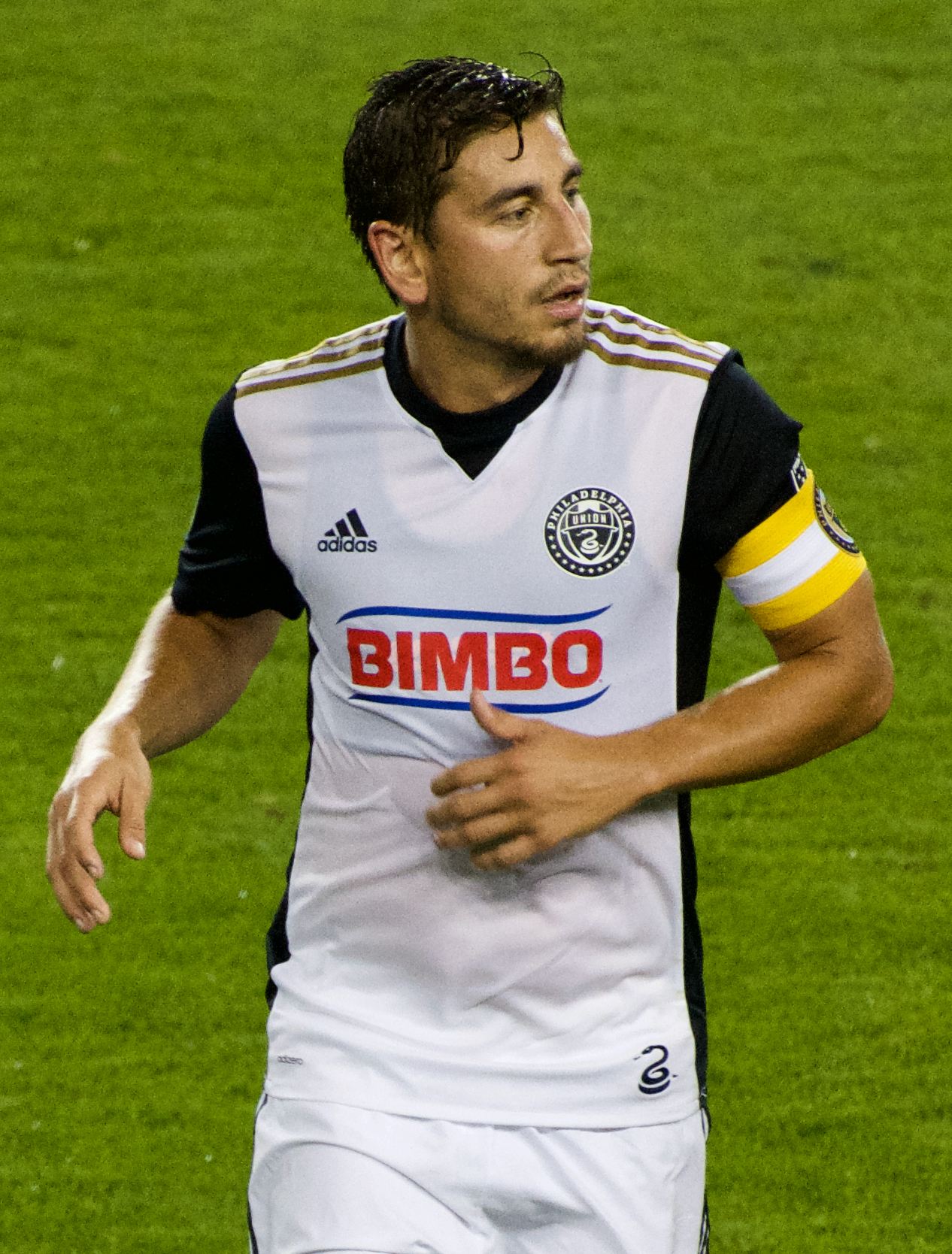
Bedoya with the Philadelphia Union in 2017

On August 3, 2016, Bedoya joined Philadelphia Union from Nantes for a reported $1 million transfer fee as a designated player. He started all ten appearances for the Union during the remainder of the 2016 and scored two goals, including the lone playoff goal against Toronto FC.

For the 2017 season, Bedoya became the Union's captain, taking over for Brian Carroll. Becoming a mainstay of the Union's midfield, Bedoya was early on deployed as a center attacking "number 10" as the team continued to search of a dedicated player for that position. Bedoya would settle into a more familiar role on the right wing and as a midfield shuttler as the Union's tactics transitioned through the next few seasons.

On August 4, 2019, Bedoya scored in the third minute of a 5–1 victory for the Union over D.C. United at Audi Field and celebrated by taking an on-field microphone to say "Congress, do something now. End gun violence," in response to two mass shootings in El Paso and Dayton. His statement, which was aired live on Fox Sports 1, resulted in national attention but no punishment or fine from the league. Bedoya also won the MLS Player of the Week for his performance during the match.

Bedoya signed a contract extension with the Union ahead of the 2020 season through 2021, with a club option for 2022, however he would no longer be a designated player. The 2020 season proved to be the most successful to date. Despite the disruptions of the COVID-19 pandemic, Bedoya captained the Union through to the semi-finals of the MLS is Back tournament and finished with the best league record of the season earning the team's first trophy, the 2020 Supporters' Shield.

In September 2022 the Union announced they had signed Bedoya to a new one-year deal through the 2023 MLS season.

On February 1, 2024, the Union announced they had once again signed Bedoya to another one-year contract through the 2024 MLS season.

== International career ==
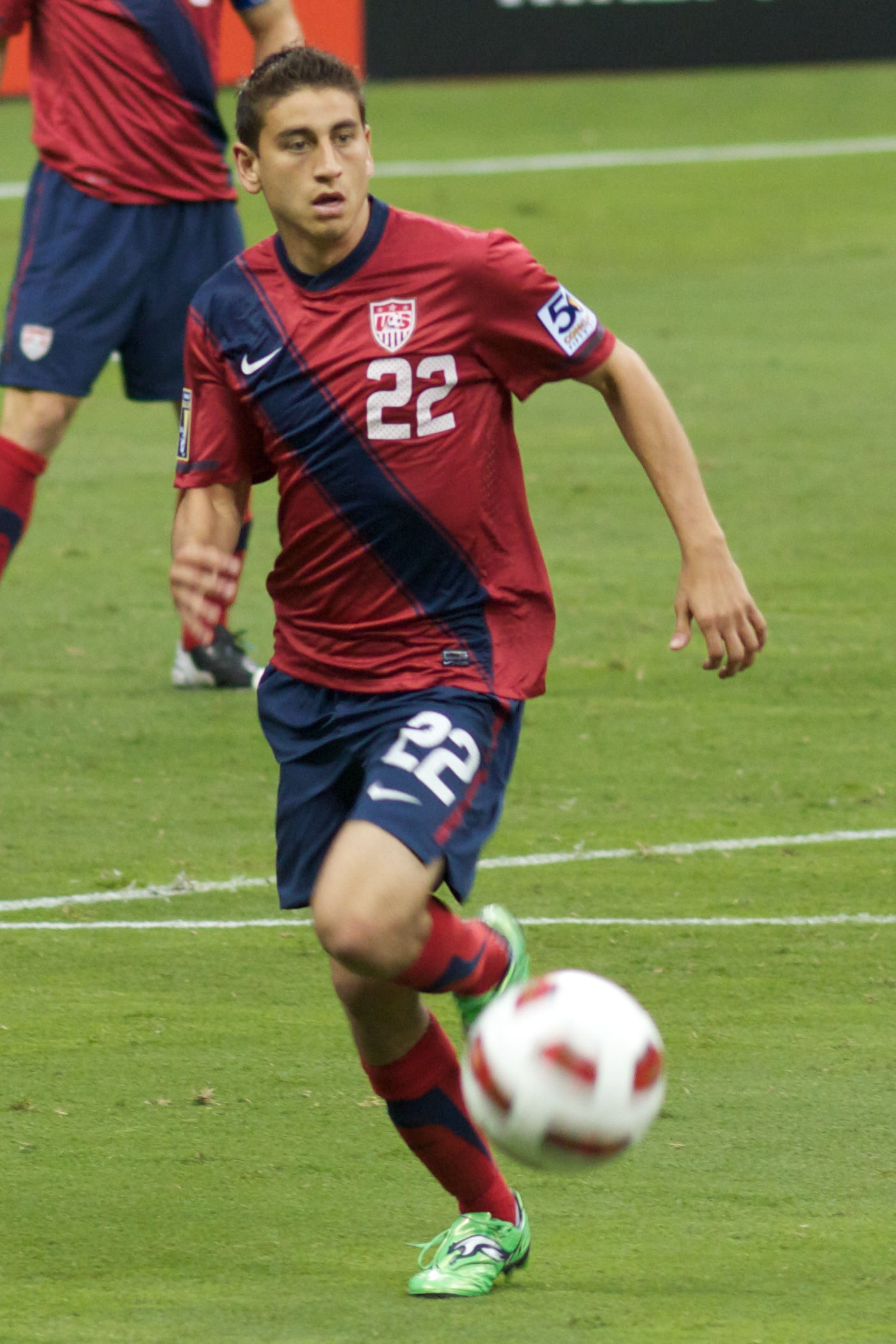
Alejandro Bedoya representing the U.S. soccer team at the 2011 Gold Cup semi-final match

Bedoya was part of the United States U-23 national team preparing for the 2008 Summer Olympics; however, he was not selected for the squad that traveled to China.

On December 22, 2009, Bedoya received his first call up to train with the senior United States national team. Training in Carson, California began for Bedoya and the other players called up on January 4, 2010, leading up to a friendly match in Carson against the Honduras national team on January 23. In the 61st minute of this match, when the U.S. was down 3–0 and was playing with ten men, Bedoya earned his first senior cap. Bedoya was named to the preliminary 30-man roster for the 2010 World Cup and played against the Czech Republic in a tune-up friendly, but was cut from the final 23-man roster. He earned his first international start in a friendly against Brazil in August 2010. He was added to the 23-man roster for the 2011 CONCACAF Gold Cup when Benny Feilhaber was unable to play due to an injury sustained while playing for his club team, the New England Revolution of Major League Soccer.

On July 5, 2013, Bedoya scored his first international goal in a friendly match against Guatemala at Qualcomm Stadium in San Diego, California. He was included in the United States roster for the 2013 CONCACAF Gold Cup, helping the national side to its first Gold Cup championship in six years. He was part of the United States squad at the 2014 FIFA World Cup and played in all four of the U.S. games.

== Career statistics ==
=== Club ===
As of match played November 7, 2026

Appearances and goals by club, season and competition
Club	Season	League			National cup (Note: Includes Svenska Cupen, Coupe de France and U.S. Open Cup)		League cup (Note: Includes Scottish League Cup, Coupe de la Ligue and MLS Cup playoffs)		Continental		Other		Total	
Club	Season	Division	Apps	Goals	Apps	Goals	Apps	Goals	Apps	Goals	Apps	Goals	Apps	Goals
Örebro SK	2009	Allsvenskan	25	2	3	1	0	0	0	0	0	0	28	3
Örebro SK	2010	Allsvenskan	26	2	2	0	0	0	0	0	0	0	28	2
Örebro SK	2011	Allsvenskan	14	4	2	0	0	0	0	0	0	0	16	4
Örebro SK	Total		65	8	7	1	0	0	0	0	0	0	72	9
Rangers	2011–12	Scottish Premier League	12	1	0	0	1	0	0	0	0	0	13	1
Helsingborgs IF	2012	Allsvenskan	9	1	0	0	0	0	8 (Note: Two appearances in UEFA Champions League, six appearances in UEFA Europa League)	2	0	0	17	3
Helsingborgs IF	2013	Allsvenskan	12	5	3	2	0	0	0	0	0	0	15	7
Helsingborgs IF	Total		21	6	3	2	0	0	8	2	0	0	32	10
Nantes	2013–14	Ligue 1	31	5	0	0	1	1	0	0	0	0	32	6
Nantes	2014–15	Ligue 1	28	3	3	0	2	0	0	0	0	0	33	3
Nantes	2015–16	Ligue 1	28	3	3	2	0	0	0	0	0	0	31	5
Nantes	Total		87	11	6	2	3	1	0	0	0	0	96	14
Philadelphia Union	2016	MLS	10	1	0	0	1	1	0	0	0	0	11	2
Philadelphia Union	2017	MLS	28	2	0	0	0	0	0	0	0	0	28	2
Philadelphia Union	2018	MLS	33	3	4	1	1	0	0	0	0	0	38	4
Philadelphia Union	2019	MLS	32	4	1	0	2	1	0	0	0	0	35	5
Philadelphia Union	2020	MLS	21 (Note: Includes three appearances and one goal in MLS is Back Tournament group stage)	3	0	0	1	0	0	0	3 (Note: Appearances in MLS is Back Tournament knockout stage)	0	25	3
Philadelphia Union	2021	MLS	32	3	0	0	2	0	6 (Note: Appearances in CONCACAF Champions League/Cup)	0	0	0	40	3
Philadelphia Union	2022	MLS	30	6	0	0	1	0	0	0	0	0	31	6
Philadelphia Union	2023	MLS	28	0	0	0	3	0	6	0	2 (Note: Appearance(s) in Leagues Cup)	2	39	2
Philadelphia Union	2024	MLS	30	2	0	0	0	0	4	0	7	0	41	2
Philadelphia Union	2025	MLS	24	1	2	1	1	0	0	0	0	0	27	2
Philadelphia Union	2026	MLS	20	0	0	0	0	0	2	0	1	0	23	0
Philadelphia Union	Total		288	25	7	2	12	2	18	0	13	2	338	31
Career total			473	51	23	7	16	3	26	2	13	2	551	65

=== International ===
Appearances and goals by national team and year
National team	Year	Apps	Goals
United States	2010	6	0
United States	2011	7	0
United States	2013	12	1
United States	2014	12	1
United States	2015	7	0
United States	2016	11	0
United States	2017	11	0
Total		66	2

Scores and results list the United States' goal tally first, score column indicates score after each Bedoya goal.

List of international goals scored by Alejandro Bedoya
No.	Date	Venue	Opponent	Score	Result	Competition
1	July 5, 2013	Qualcomm Stadium, San Diego, United States	Guatemala	6–0	6–0	Friendly
2	September 3, 2014	Generali Arena, Prague, Czech Republic	Czech Republic	1–0	1–0	Friendly

== Honors ==
Philadelphia Union

- Supporters Shield: 2020, 2025
- MLS Cup runner-up: 2022

United States

- CONCACAF Gold Cup: 2013, 2017

Individual

- NCAA First-Team All-American: 2007
- Atlantic Coast Conference Men's Offensive Player of the Year: 2007
- MLS Humanitarian of the Year: 2022
