= Nathan Harriel =

American soccer player (born 2001)

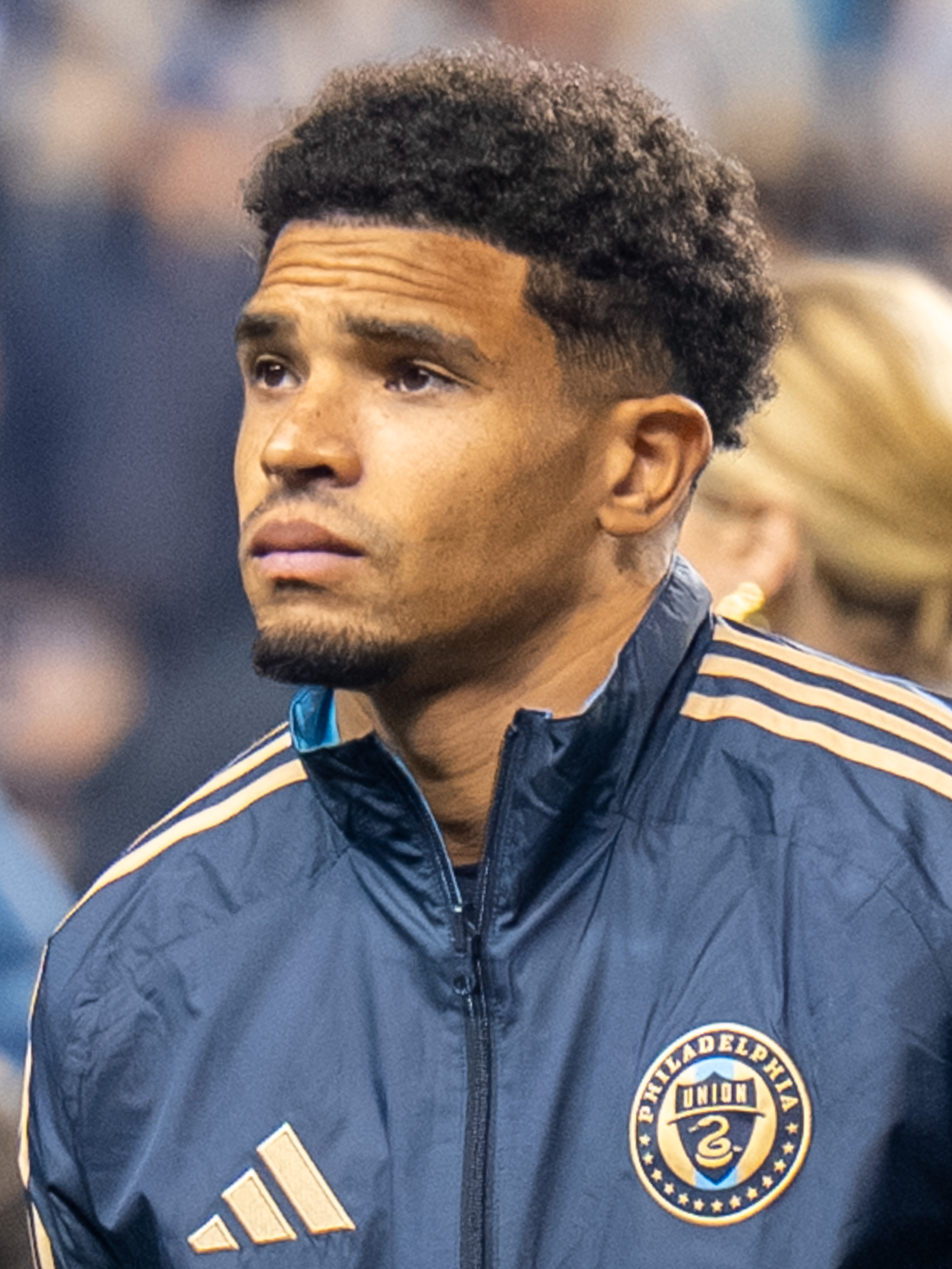
- Harriel with the Philadelphia Union in 2025

Personal information
- Full name: Nathan Lee William Harriel
- Date of birth: April 23, 2001 (age 25)
- Place of birth: Oldsmar, Florida, U.S.
- Height: 5 ft 10 in (1.78 m)
- Position: Defender

Team information
- Current team: Philadelphia Union
- Number: 26

Youth career
- 2015–2018: Clearwater Chargers
- 2018–2020: Philadelphia Union

Senior career*
Years	Team	Apps	(Gls)
2019–2022	Philadelphia Union II	41	(1)
2021–	Philadelphia Union	144	(11)
2025	→ Philadelphia Union II (loan)	1	(0)

International career^{‡}
2018	United States U18	3	(0)
2019	United States U19	1	(0)
2019–2020	United States U20	3	(1)
2023–2024	United States U23	11	(1)
2025–	United States	3	(0)
Medal record
Representing United States
Men's football
CONCACAF Gold Cup
Runner-up	2025 Canada–United States
- * Club domestic league appearances and goals as of April 1, 2025 ‡ National team caps and goals as of September 9, 2025

Nathan Lee William Harriel (/ˈhæriəl/ HARR-ee-əl; born April 23, 2001) is an American professional soccer player who plays as a defender for the Philadelphia Union of Major League Soccer and the United States national team.

== Club career ==
Harriel appeared as an amateur player for USL Championship side Bethlehem Steel during their 2019 season, as well as being part of the Philadelphia Union academy.

In 2019, Harriel verbally committed to play college soccer at Clemson University. However, on July 17, 2020, Harriel signed with Philadelphia Union as a homegrown player, beginning from the 2021 season. They acquired his homegrown rights from Orlando City SC in exchange for a first round 2021 MLS SuperDraft pick.

Harriel was first named to senior matchday squads during the 2021 season, and made his senior debut on September 3, playing at right back. Both players who had played in the position during the season, Olivier Mbaizo and Alvas Powell, were away on international duty.

== International career ==
In January 2024 he was selected for the senior United States squad for a match against Slovenia.

== Career statistics ==
=== Club ===
As of match played on October 29th, 2026

Appearances and goals by club, season and competition
Club	Season	League			National cup (Note: Includes U.S. Open Cup)		Continental		Other (Note: Includes MLS Cup playoffs, Leagues Cup)		Total	
Club	Season	Division	Apps	Goals	Apps	Goals	Apps	Goals	Apps	Goals	Apps	Goals
Bethlehem Steel	2019	USL	23	0	—		—		—		23	0
Philadelphia Union II	2020	USL	13	0	—		—		—		13	0
Philadelphia Union II	2022	MLS Next Pro	5	1	—		—		—		5	1
Philadelphia Union II	Total		18	1	—		—		—		18	1
Philadelphia Union	2021	MLS	5	0	—		—		2	0	7	0
Philadelphia Union	2022	MLS	25	1	—		—		—		25	1
Philadelphia Union	2023	MLS	25	1	1	0	5 (Note: Appearance(s) in CONCACAF Champions Cup)	0	8	3	39	4
Philadelphia Union	2024	MLS	29	2	—		4	0	4	0	37	2
Philadelphia Union	2025	MLS	28	2	3	0	—		—		31	2
Philadelphia Union	2026	MLS	32	1	—		3	0	2	1	37	2
Philadelphia Union	Total		144	7	4	0	12	0	16	4	176	11
Career total			162	8	4	0	12	0	16	4	194	12

=== International ===
As of match played September 9, 2025

Appearances and goals by national team and year
National team	Year	Apps	Goals
United States	2025	3	0
Total		3	0

== Honors ==
Philadelphia Union

- Supporters' Shield: 2025
- MLS Cup runner-up: 2022
