= Leon Flach =

American soccer player (born 2001)

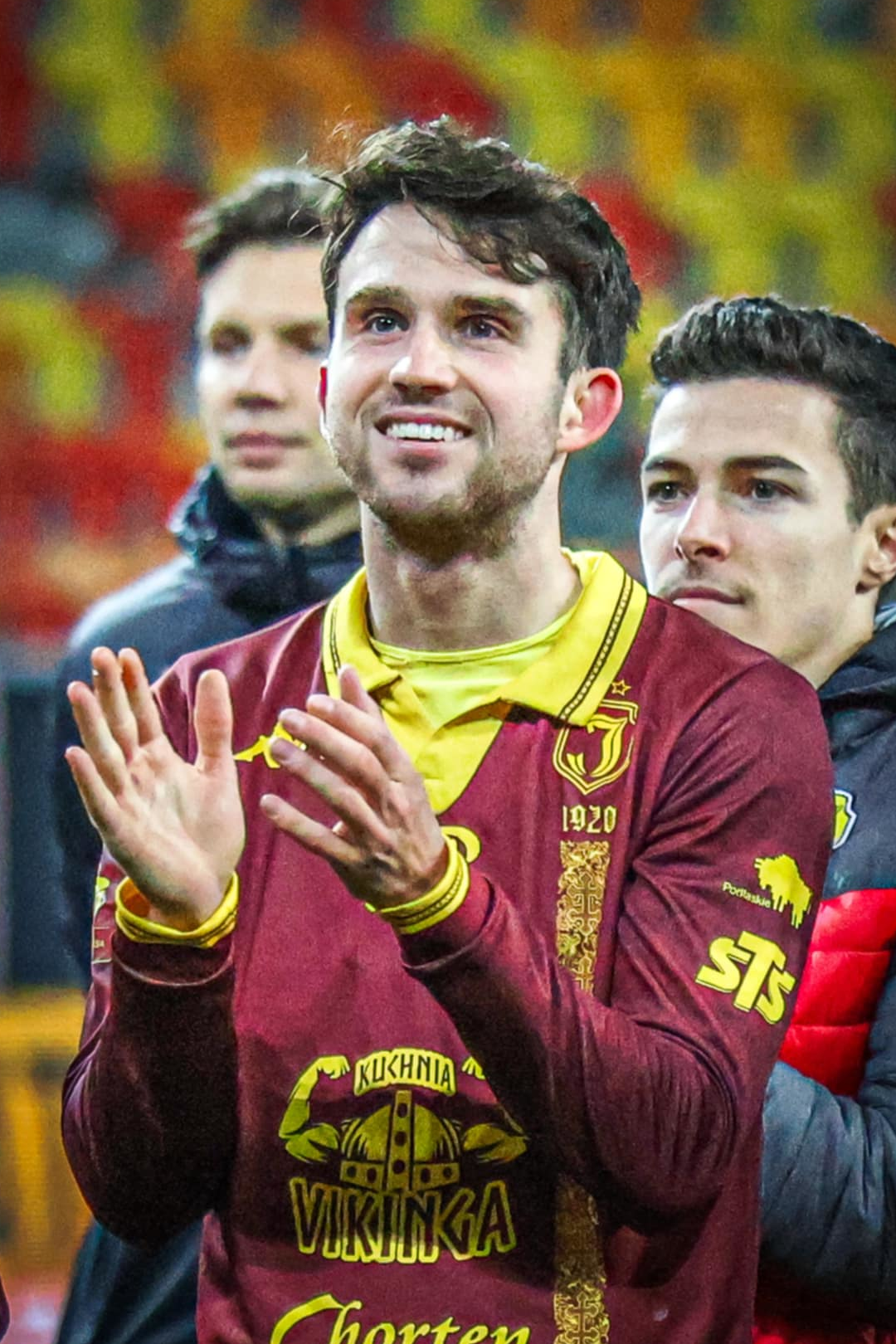
- Flach in 2025 with Jagiellonia Białystok

Personal information
- Full name: Leon Maximilian Flach
- Date of birth: February 28, 2001 (age 25)
- Place of birth: Humble, Texas, United States
- Height: 5 ft 10 in (1.78 m)
- Positions: Midfielder; left-back

Team information
- Current team: VfL Osnabrück (on loan from Jagiellonia Białystok)
- Number: 18

Youth career
- 2006–2008: Sereetzer SV
- 2008–2016: VfB Lübeck
- 2016–2020: FC St. Pauli

Senior career*
Years	Team	Apps	(Gls)
2020–2021	FC St. Pauli	9	(1)
2020	FC St. Pauli II	3	(1)
2021–2024	Philadelphia Union	116	(2)
2025–	Jagiellonia Białystok	33	(1)
2026–	→ VfL Osnabrück (loan)	0	(0)

International career
2019	Germany U18	2	(0)
2020	United States U20	2	(0)
- * Club domestic league appearances and goals as of August 30, 2026

Leon Maximilian Flach (born February 28, 2001) is an American professional soccer player who plays as a midfielder or left-back for 2. Bundesliga club VfL Osnabrück, on loan from Ekstraklasa club Jagiellonia Białystok.

== Club career ==
=== FC St. Pauli ===
Flach made his professional debut for FC St. Pauli in the 2. Bundesliga on September 27, 2020, coming on as a substitute in the 85th minute for Jannes Wieckhoff against 1. FC Heidenheim, which finished as a 4–2 home win.

Flach scored his first professional goal for FC St. Pauli on January 3, 2021, scoring in the 82nd minute against Greuther Fürth in a 2–1 loss.

=== Philadelphia Union ===
In March 2021, Flach signed a two-year contract with Philadelphia Union competing in Major League Soccer. Flach's debut with the Union was starting in the club's first CONCACAF Champions League match, defeating Deportivo Saprissa 1–0. Flach scored his first goal for the Union on October 3 against reigning MLS Champions, Columbus Crew in a 3–0 win. His performances throughout the 2021 season made Flach a regular starter in the Union midfield and was recognized as being named among the MLS's 22 under 22.

=== Jagiellonia Białystok ===
On January 15, 2025, free agent Flach joined Polish defending champions and UEFA Conference League participants Jagiellonia Białystok on a two-and-a-half-year deal, with an option for another year.

On September 1, 2026, he returned to Germany and joined VfL Osnabrück on loan.

== Personal life ==
Flach was born in Texas to German parents while his father was working in Houston before returning to Hamburg as a child. He has represented Germany and the United States at youth level. Flach is a fan of the Houston Texans.

== Career statistics ==
As of match played May 9, 2026

Appearances and goals by club, season and competition
Club	Season	League			National cup (Note: Includes U.S. Open Cup, Polish Cup)		Continental		Other		Total	
Club	Season	Division	Apps	Goals	Apps	Goals	Apps	Goals	Apps	Goals	Apps	Goals
FC St. Pauli II	2020–21	Regionalliga Nord	3	1	—		—		—		3	1
FC St. Pauli	2020–21	2. Bundesliga	9	1	—		—		—		9	1
Philadelphia Union	2021	MLS	34	1	—		6 (Note: Appearances in CONCACAF Champions League)	0	3 (Note: Appearances in MLS Cup Playoffs)	0	43	1
Philadelphia Union	2022	MLS	34	0	1	0	—		3	1	38	1
Philadelphia Union	2023	MLS	25	1	1	0	4	0	5 (Note: Three appearances in Leagues Cup, two appearances in MLS Cup Playoffs)	0	35	1
Philadelphia Union	2024	MLS	23	0	0	0	—		6 (Note: Appearances in Leagues Cup)	0	29	0
Philadelphia Union	Total		116	2	2	0	10	0	17	1	145	3
Jagiellonia Białystok	2024–25	Ekstraklasa	13	0	1	0	5 (Note: Appearances in UEFA Conference League)	0	1 (Note: Appearance in Polish Super Cup)	0	20	0
Jagiellonia Białystok	2025–26	Ekstraklasa	20	1	2	0	13	0	—		35	1
Jagiellonia Białystok	Total		33	1	3	0	18	0	1	0	55	1
Career total			161	5	5	0	28	0	18	1	212	6

== Honors ==
Philadelphia Union

- MLS Cup runner-up: 2022

Jagiellonia Białystok

- Polish Super Cup: 2024
