= Bajung Darboe =

American soccer player (born 2006)

Personal information
- Full name: Bajung Darboe
- Date of birth: November 7, 2006 (age 19)
- Place of birth: Gambia
- Height: 1.84 m (6 ft 0 in)
- Positions: Winger; attacking midfielder

Team information
- Current team: Bayern Munich II

Youth career
- Chicago Fire
- 2020: Minnesota United
- 2020–2023: Philadelphia Union

Senior career*
Years	Team	Apps	(Gls)
2022	Philadelphia Union II	14	(0)
2023–2025	Los Angeles FC	0	(0)
2023–2025	Los Angeles FC 2	15	(0)
2025–	Bayern Munich II	28	(2)

International career^{‡}
2022	United States U17	2	(0)
2025–	United States U20	3	(0)
- * Club domestic league appearances and goals as of April 30, 2026 ‡ National team caps and goals as of June 8, 2026

Bajung Darboe (born November 7, 2006) is a professional soccer player who plays as a winger and attacking midfielder for Regionalliga Bayern club Bayern Munich II. Born in The Gambia, he represents the United States at the youth level internationally.

== Club career ==
=== Philadelphia Union II ===
Darboe started his youth career with Chicago Fire's academy. He joined Philadelphia Union II on July 1, 2020, from Minnesota United's academy. Darboe earned 14 caps during the 2022 MLS Next Pro season. On January 1, 2023, he was released by the club.

=== Los Angeles FC ===
On June 9, 2023, Darboe signed a Homegrown contract with Los Angeles FC in exchange for $50,000 in General Allocation Money with a sell-on clause for Minnesota United. Los Angeles FC acquired Darboe's homegrown priority from Minnesota United.

=== Bayern Munich ===
In November 2024, reports stated that Bundesliga club Bayern Munich agreed to pay $1.5 million for Darboe, having trained at the club in 2022, who is expected to join the reserve team on January 1, ahead of the second leg of the 2024–25 season. He joined Bayern Munich II and was officially presented on January 15, 2025.

Darboe made his debut with the Bayern Munich under-19 squad for a 3–2 away loss U19 Nachwuchsliga match against the under-19 squad of 1. FC Heidenheim on 15 February 2025.

On 4 April 2025, he made his debut with Bayern Munich II for a 2–1 away loss Regionalliga Bayern match against TSV Buchbach.

Darboe scored his first professional goal with Bayern Munich II, during a 5–0 home win Regionalliga Bayern match against TSV Schwaben Augsburg on 8 August 2025.

== International career ==
=== United States U17 ===
Born in Gambia, Darboe holds dual American-Finnish citizenship, making him eligible to represent both Finland and the United States. Darboe has played two friendlies while representing the United States U17 in 2022.

=== United States U20 ===
On November 8, 2025, United States under-20 head coach Rob Valentino called-up Darboe as one of the 20 players who were named to the squad for the November 15 and 18 friendly matches against Costa Rica under-20.

== Career statistics ==
=== Club ===
As of match played April 30, 2026

Club	Season	League			National cup		Continental		Other		Total	
Club	Season	Division	Apps	Goals	Apps	Goals	Apps	Goals	Apps	Goals	Apps	Goals
Philadelphia Union II	2022	MLS Next Pro	14	0	—		—		1 (Note: Appearance in MLS Next Pro Play-offs)	0	15	0
Philadelphia Union II	Total		14	0	0	0	0	0	1	0	15	0
Los Angeles FC 2	2023	MLS Next Pro	1	0	—		—		0	0	1	0
Los Angeles FC 2	2024	MLS Next Pro	14	0	—		—		0	0	14	0
Los Angeles FC 2	Total		15	0	0	0	0	0	0	0	15	0
Bayern Munich II	2024–25	Regionalliga Bayern	7	0	—		—		0	0	7	0
Bayern Munich II	2025–26	Regionalliga Bayern	21	2	—		—		0	0	21	2
Bayern Munich II	Total		28	2	—		—		0	0	28	2
Career total			57	2	0	0	0	0	1	0	58	2
