= Nelson Pierre =

Haitian footballer (born 2005)

Personal information
- Full name: Nelson Guichard Pierre
- Date of birth: 22 March 2005 (age 21)
- Place of birth: Lebanon, Pennsylvania, U.S.
- Height: 1.85 m (6 ft 1 in)
- Position: Forward

Team information
- Current team: HFX Wanderers FC (on loan from Vancouver Whitecaps FC)

Youth career
- Super Nova FC
- 2014–2022: Philadelphia Union

Senior career*
Years	Team	Apps	(Gls)
2022	Philadelphia Union II	20	(5)
2023–2025	Philadelphia Union	0	(0)
2023	→ Philadelphia Union II (loan)	27	(4)
2024	→ Skövde AIK (loan)	0	(0)
2024	→ Charlotte Independence (loan)	9	(1)
2025	→ Whitecaps FC 2 (loan)	14	(11)
2025–	Vancouver Whitecaps FC	3	(1)
2025	→ Whitecaps FC 2 (loan)	8	(2)
2026	→ FC Tulsa (loan)	8	(1)
2026–	→ HFX Wanderers FC (loan)	6	(1)

International career^{‡}
2024–	Haiti U20	3	(0)
- * Club domestic league appearances and goals as of 4 October 2026 ‡ National team caps and goals as of 28 July 2024

Nelson Guichard Pierre (born 22 March 2005) is a professional footballer who plays for HFX Wanderers FC in the Canadian Premier League, on loan from Major League Soccer club Vancouver Whitecaps FC. Born in the United States, he represents Haiti at youth international level.

== Early life ==
Pierre played youth soccer with Super Nova FC, before joining the Philadelphia Union Academy in 2014.

== Club career ==
In March 2022, Pierre signed a professional contract with Philadelphia Union II, becoming their first signing ahead of their inaugural season in MLS Next Pro. He made his professional debut on 27 March 2022 against FC Cincinnati 2.

In February 2023, Pierre signed a homegrown player contract with the Philadelphia Union first team, through the 2026 season, with an option for 2027. In January 2024, he was loaned to Swedish club Skövde AIK in the second-tier Superettan for the remainder of 2024. In August 2024, they recalled him from the loan and immediately loaned him to the Charlotte Independence in USL League One.

In February 2025, he was sent on loan to Whitecaps FC 2 in MLS Next Pro. In late June 2025, the Vancouver Whitecaps FC first team picked up the option on his contract, adding him to their first team roster, sending $50,000 to the Philadelphia Union for the transfer, with Philadelphia retaining a sell-on clause. At the time of his promotion to the Vancouver first team, he was leading MLS Next Pro in scoring with 11 goals in 14 matches. On July 4, 2025, he made his MLS debut for the Whitecaps, in a substitute appearance, against the LA Galaxy.

On February 24, 2026, FC Tulsa of the USL Championship announced they had acquired Pierre on loan from Vancouver. In late August 2026, he was loaned to HFX Wanderers FC in the Canadian Premier League.

== International career ==
In 2021, Pierre received an invite to a United States Youth National Team Regional Identification Center Camp.

He played with the Haiti U20 at the 2024 CONCACAF U-20 Championship, making three appearances.

== Personal life ==
He is the brother of fellow soccer player Neil Pierre.
