= José Riasco =

Venezuelan footballer (born 2004)

Personal information
- Full name: José Alexander Riasco Brizuela
- Date of birth: February 2, 2004 (age 22)
- Place of birth: Ciudad Guayana, Venezuela
- Height: 1.87 m (6 ft 2 in)
- Position: Forward

Team information
- Current team: Metropolitanos (on loan from Philadelphia Union II)

Youth career
- Deportivo La Guaira

Senior career*
Years	Team	Apps	(Gls)
2021–2022	Deportivo La Guaira	23	(5)
2022–2023	Philadelphia Union II	26	(4)
2023–2024	Boston River	18	(1)
2024–	Philadelphia Union II	6	(0)
2025-2026	→ Carabobo (loan)	18	(1)
2026-	→ Metropolitanos (loan)	3	(1)

International career^{‡}
2022–	Venezuela U20	2	(1)
- * Club domestic league appearances and goals as of 6 January 2025 ‡ National team caps and goals as of 19:17, 9 October 2022 (UTC)

José Alexander Riasco Brizuela (born 2 February 2004) is a Venezuelan footballer who plays as a forward for Metropolitanos on loan from Philadelphia Union II. He has also played for Venezuela's U20 and U23 teams.

== Club career ==
Riasco signed for the Philadelphia Union in 2022 for a $1 million fee.

== Career statistics ==
=== Club ===
As of 27 March 2024.

Club	Season	League			Cup		Continental		Other		Total	
Club	Season	Division	Apps	Goals	Apps	Goals	Apps	Goals	Apps	Goals	Apps	Goals
Deportivo La Guaira	2021	Venezuelan Primera División	23	5	0	0	1 (Note: Appearances in the Copa Libertadores)	0	0	0	24	5
Philadelphia Union II	2022	MLS Next Pro	16	3	–		–		0	0	16	3
Philadelphia Union II	2023	MLS Next Pro	10	1	–		–		0	0	10	1
Philadelphia Union II	Total		26	4	–		–		0	0	26	4
Boston River	2023	Uruguayan Primera División	11	1	–		–		0	0	11	1
Boston River	2024	Uruguayan Primera División	2	0	–		–		0	0	2	0
Boston River	Total		13	1	–		–		0	0	13	1
Career total			62	9	0	0	1	0	0	0	63	9
