= Chris Donovan (soccer) =

American soccer player (born 2000)

Personal information
- Full name: Christopher David Donovan
- Date of birth: August 8, 2000 (age 26)
- Place of birth: Paoli, Pennsylvania, United States
- Height: 6 ft 0 in (1.83 m)
- Position: Forward

Team information
- Current team: Louisville City
- Number: 9

Youth career
- 2014–2017: Conestoga Pioneers

College career
Years	Team	Apps	(Gls)
2018–2021	Drexel Dragons	60	(30)

Senior career*
Years	Team	Apps	(Gls)
2019–2021	West Chester United	11	(8)
2022–2025	Philadelphia Union II	35	(18)
2022–2025	Philadelphia Union	42	(2)
2026–	Louisville City	29	(7)
- * Club domestic league appearances and goals as of November 7, 2026

Christopher David Donovan (born August 8, 2000) is an American professional soccer player who plays as a forward for Louisville City FC of USL Championship.

== Career ==
=== High school ===
Donovan was named Gatorade Player of the Year in Pennsylvania in 2018. Previously, Donovan had played four years of varsity soccer at Conestoga High School, where he was a three-time First Team All-Main Line player, leading Conestoga to a Central League championship in each of his last three seasons, and was named the league's MVP as a senior. Donovan was also a two-time state champion in 2016 and 2017. He led the team in scoring in each of his final three years, scoring 56 goals as a senior in 2017, which earned him First Team All-State and All-American honors as a senior, and was named the Philadelphia Daily News Local Player of the Year.

=== College ===
In 2018, Donovan attended Drexel University to play college soccer. In four seasons with the Dragons, Donovan made 60 appearances, scoring 30 goals and tallying 13 assists. He also earned numerous accolades his senior year, including the Philadelphia Inquirer Men's Soccer Performer of the Year, Chris Jones Philly Soccer Six Player of the Year, Colonial Athletic Association Player of the Year, and the United Soccer Coaches Atlantic Region First Team.

While in college, Donovan also played with West Chester United. He made two regular season appearances and one play-off appearance for the team during their 2019 season in the NPSL, scoring three goals. In 2020 West Chester moved to the USL League Two, but the season was cancelled due to the COVID-19 pandemic. He made nine appearances for the club in 2021, scoring six goals and adding three assists.

=== Professional ===
==== Philadelphia Union ====
On January 11, 2022, Donovan was drafted 68th overall in the 2022 MLS SuperDraft by Columbus Crew. He was let go by Columbus during their preseason. He subsequently signed with MLS Next Pro side Philadelphia Union II on February 1, 2022, ahead of the league's inaugural season. On June 17, 2022, Donovan was signed by Philadelphia Union, and joined the club's Major League Soccer roster. Philadelphia sent Chicago Fire FC $50,000 of General Allocation Money to move up to the top spot of the MLS Waiver Order to select him. At the end of the 2025 season, the Union declined an option for an additional season.

==== Louisville City ====
On February 6, 2026 Louisville City announced the signing of Donovan on a 2 year deal.

== Honors ==
Philadelphia Union

- Supporters' Shield: 2025
- MLS Cup runner-up: 2022
