= Jesús Bueno =

Venezuelan footballer (born 1999)

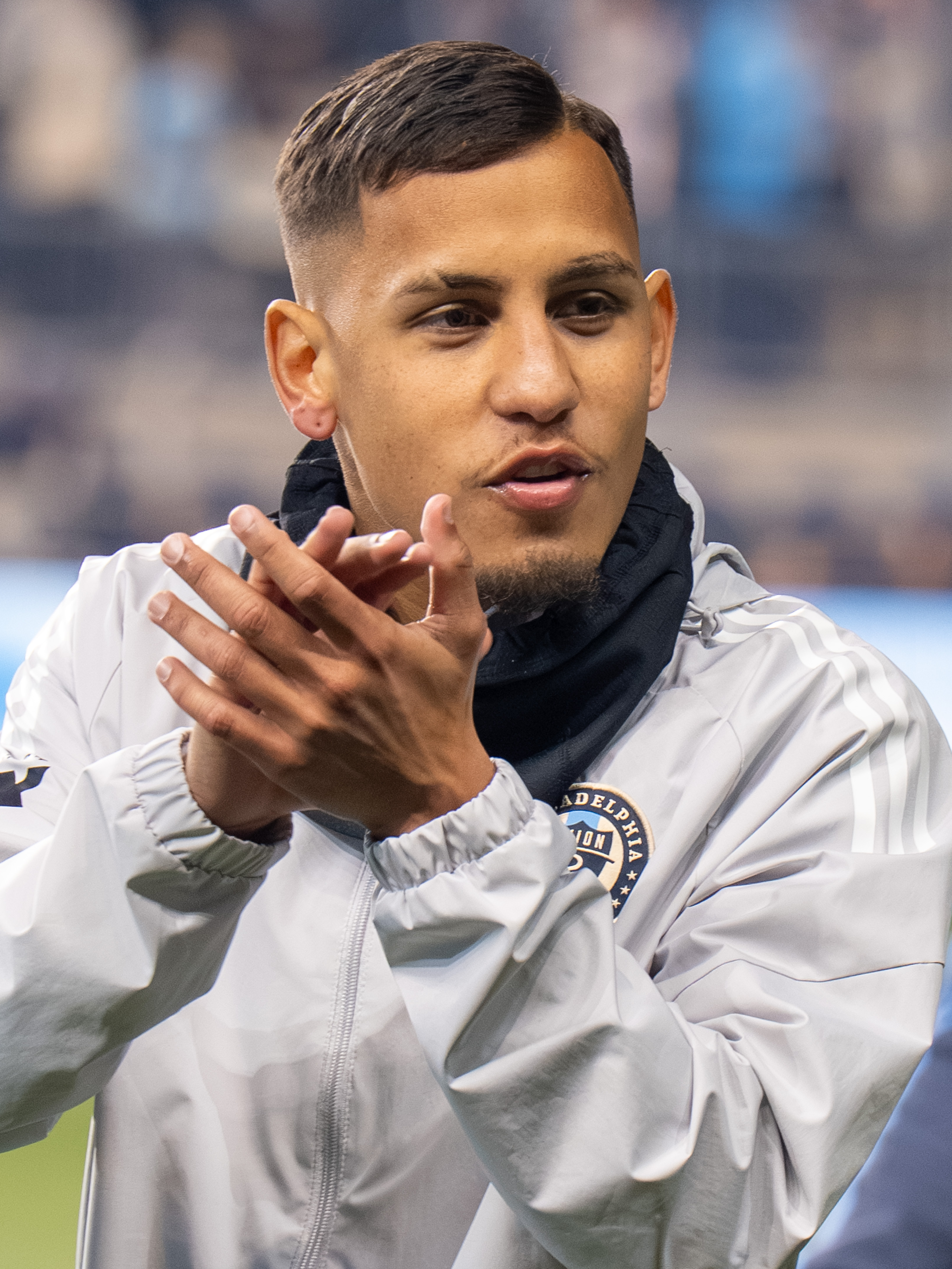
- Bueno with the Philadelphia Union in 2025

Personal information
- Full name: Jesús Daniel Bueno Áñez
- Date of birth: 15 April 1999 (age 27)
- Place of birth: Barquisimeto, Venezuela
- Height: 5 ft 10 in (1.78 m)
- Position: Defensive midfielder

Team information
- Current team: Philadelphia Union
- Number: 8

Youth career
- Deportivo Lara

Senior career*
Years	Team	Apps	(Gls)
2016–2021	Deportivo Lara	90	(9)
2021–	Philadelphia Union	46	(3)
2022	Philadelphia Union II	14	(6)

International career
2018	Venezuela U20	1	(0)
2023–	Venezuela	2	(0)
- * Club domestic league appearances and goals as of 16 March 2025

Jesús Daniel Bueno Áñez (born 15 April 1999) is a Venezuelan professional footballer who plays as a defensive midfielder for the Philadelphia Union of Major League Soccer and the Venezuela national team.

== Club career ==
=== Deportivo Lara ===
Bueno played for Deportivo Lara as a youth before making his professional debut on October 23, 2016, as a starter in a 2–1 loss to Zamora. He scored his first goal on January 28, 2018, in a 3–2 win over Atletico Venezuela. Bueno has played in the Primera Division Championship Playoffs (2017, 2018 and 2020), and in his final playoff appearance with the club in 2020 he scored in the third minute of extra time for a 1–0 win over Caracas that secured his team third place overall. For the 2021 season, Bueno served as the captain of the team. On May 3, 2021, Bueno notched his first professional brace in a 4–1 win over Aragua FC. He made 81 Primera Division and 2 League Cup appearances for the Venezuelan side, scoring nine goals and logging three assists in that time.

He also made 6 appearances in the Copa Libertadores and 1 appearance in the Copa Sudamericana.

=== Philadelphia Union ===
On 29 July 2021, Bueno joined Major League Soccer club Philadelphia Union.

== International career ==
Bueno participated in several Venezuela U20 training camps in 2018. He made his debut as a starter in a 1–0 loss to Chile on June 1, 2018.

In May 2021, Bueno was called into the national team's Copa America training camp. He had to leave camp shortly thereafter upon being diagnosed with COVID-19.

== Honours ==
Philadelphia Union

- Supporters' Shield: 2025
- MLS Cup runner-up: 2022
