= 2024 Los Angeles FC season =

Los Angeles FC
2024 season
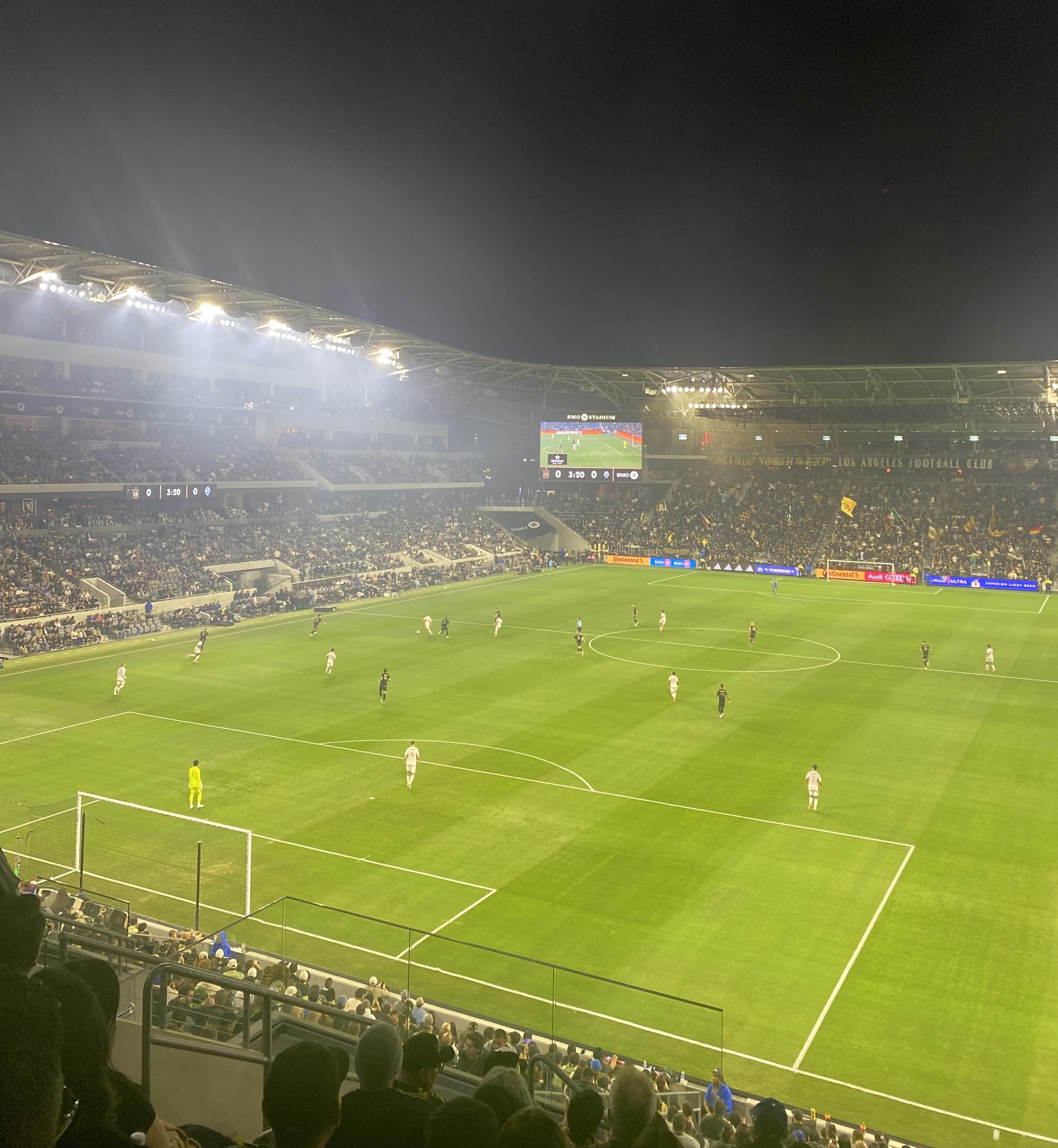
- A playoff match against the Vancouver Whitecaps at BMO Stadium on October 27, 2024
- General manager: John Thorrington
- Head coach: Steve Cherundolo
- Stadium: BMO Stadium
- MLS: Conference: 1st Overall: 3rd
- MLS Cup playoffs: Conference Semifinals
- U.S. Open Cup: Winners
- Leagues Cup: Runners-up
- Top goalscorer: League: Denis Bouanga (20); All: Denis Bouanga (28)
- Average home league attendance: 22,121
- Biggest win: LAFC 5–0 NSH (3/23)
- Biggest defeat: LAFC 1–5 CLB (7/13)
Home colors	Away colors

The 2024 Los Angeles FC season was the club's seventh season in Major League Soccer, the top tier of the American soccer pyramid. LAFC plays its home matches at BMO Stadium in the Exposition Park neighborhood of Los Angeles, California.

== Squad ==
=== First-team roster ===
As of October 20, 2024

No.	Name	Nationality	Pos	Date of birth (age)	Apps	Goals
1	Hugo Lloris	France	GK	December 26, 1986 (age 39)	33	0
12	Thomas Hasal	Canada	GK	July 9, 1999 (age 27)	1	0
31	David Ochoa	Mexico	GK	January 16, 2001 (age 25)	0	0
2	Omar Campos (INTL)	Mexico	DF	July 20, 2002 (age 24)	27	0
3	Jesús Murillo	Colombia	DF	February 18, 1994 (age 32)	22	0
4	Eddie Segura	Colombia	DF	February 2, 1997 (age 29)	28	0
5	Marlon	Brazil	DF	September 7, 1995 (age 30)	5	1
14	Sergi Palencia	Spain	DF	March 23, 1996 (age 30)	30	0
15	Lorenzo Dellavalle	Italy	DF	April 4, 2004 (age 22)	0	0
18	Erik Dueñas (HG)	United States	DF	October 18, 2004 (age 21)	14	0
24	Ryan Hollingshead	United States	DF	April 16, 1991 (age 35)	31	1
25	Maxime Chanot	Luxembourg	DF	November 21, 1989 (age 36)	23	0
33	Aaron Long	United States	DF	October 12, 1992 (age 33)	29	1
42	Luca Bombino (HG)	United States	DF	July 10, 2006 (age 20)	0	0
43	Diego Rosales (HG)	United States	DF	November 1, 2005 (age 20)	0	0
6	Ilie Sánchez	Spain	MF	November 21, 1990 (age 35)	31	1
8	Lewis O'Brien	England	MF	October 14, 1998 (age 27)	9	0
11	Timothy Tillman	United States	MF	January 4, 1999 (age 27)	32	4
19	Mateusz Bogusz	Poland	MF	August 22, 2001 (age 24)	32	15
20	Eduard Atuesta	Colombia	MF	June 18, 1997 (age 29)	28	4
36	Tommy Musto	United States	MF	November 10, 2003 (age 22)	0	0
9	Olivier Giroud	France	FW	September 30, 1986 (age 39)	10	0
13	Cristian Olivera	Uruguay	FW	April 17, 2002 (age 24)	21	6
21	Tomás Ángel	Colombia	FW	February 20, 2003 (age 23)	5	1
23	Kei Kamara	Sierra Leone	FW	September 1, 1984 (age 41)	27	3
27	Nathan Ordaz (HG)	El Salvador	FW	January 12, 2004 (age 22)	17	1
30	David Martínez	Venezuela	FW	February 7, 2006 (age 20)	17	4
55	Bajung Darboe (HG)	United States	FW	November 7, 2006 (age 19)	0	0
77	Adrian Wibowo (HG)	Indonesia	FW	January 17, 2006 (age 20)	0	0
91	Luis Müller	Germany	FW	February 12, 2001 (age 25)	4	0
99	Denis Bouanga	Gabon	FW	November 11, 1994 (age 31)	32	20

=== Los Angeles FC 2 players that made MLS appearances ===
No.	Name	Nationality	Pos	Date of birth (age)	Apps	Goals

== Coaching staff ==
As of May 13, 2024

Technical staff
Head coach	(United States) Steve Cherundolo
Assistant coach	(Canada) Marc Dos Santos
Assistant coach	(United States) Ante Razov
Assistant coach	(Spain) Enrique Duran
Assistant/Goalkeeping coach	(North Macedonia) Oka Nikolov
Assistant coach/Performance director	(South Africa) Gavin Benjafield
Co-President & General Manager	(United States) John Thorrington
Technical Director	(Scotland) Neil McGuinness

== Transfers ==
=== Transfers in ===
Entry date	Position	Player	From club	Notes	Ref.
December 30, 2023	GK	(France) Hugo Lloris	(England) Tottenham Hotspur	Transfer	
January 24, 2024	DF	(Italy) Lorenzo Dellavalle	(United States) Los Angeles FC 2	Transfer	
January 30, 2024	DF	(Mexico) Omar Campos	(Mexico) Santos Laguna	Transfer	
January 31, 2024	FW	(Colombia) Tomas Ángel	(Colombia) Atlético Nacional	Free transfer	
February 1, 2024	FW	(Venezuela) David Martínez	(Venezuela) Monagas	Transfer	
March 27, 2024	DF	(Luxembourg) Maxime Chanot	(France) Ajaccio	Transfer	
March 29, 2024	FW	(Sierra Leone) Kei Kamara	unattached (Note: Signed previously with the Chicago Fire.)	Free agent	
May 3, 2024	FW	(Germany) Luis Müller	(United States) Los Angeles FC 2	Transfer	
May 14, 2024	FW	(France) Olivier Giroud	(Italy) AC Milan	Free transfer	
June 5, 2024	GK	(Canada) Thomas Hasal	unattached (Note: Signed previously with the Vancouver Whitecaps.)	Free agent	
September 11, 2024	DF	(Brazil) Marlon	unattached (Note: Signed previously with Shakhtar Donetsk.)	Free agent	
September 13, 2024	DF	(United States) Luca Bombino	(United States) Los Angeles FC 2	Homegrown signing	
September 13, 2024	DF	(United States) Adrian Wibowo	(United States) Los Angeles FC 2	Homegrown signing	
September 13, 2024	GK	(Mexico) David Ochoa	(United States) Los Angeles FC 2	First-team signing	
September 13, 2024	DF	(United States) Diego Rosales	(United States) Los Angeles FC 2	First-team signing	

=== Transfers out ===
Exit date	Position	Player	To club	Notes	Ref.
December 12, 2023	DF	(Italy) Giorgio Chiellini	N/A	Retired	
December 12, 2023	FW	(Mexico) Christian Torres	(Mexico) Tapatío	Declined contract options	
December 12, 2023	MF	(United States) Daniel Crisostomo	(United States) Tampa Bay Rowdies	Declined contract options	
December 12, 2023	DF	(United States) Julian Gaines	(United States) Nashville SC	Declined contract options	
December 12, 2023	DF	(Mexico) Tony Leone	(Mexico) Monterrey	Declined contract options	
December 12, 2023	DF	(Senegal) Mohamed Traore	(United States) Phoenix Rising	Declined contract options	
December 12, 2023	GK	(United States) John McCarthy	(United States) LA Galaxy	End of contract	
December 12, 2023	GK	(Switzerland) Eldin Jakupović	(United States) Chattanooga FC	End of contract	
December 12, 2023	GK	(Canada) Maxime Crépeau	(United States) Portland Timbers	Free agent	
December 12, 2023	MF	(United States) Kellyn Acosta	(United States) Chicago Fire	Free agent	
December 31, 2023	DF	(Honduras) Denil Maldonado	(Honduras) Motagua	End of loan	
January 2, 2024	DF	(Ecuador) Diego Palacios	(Brazil) Corinthians	Free transfer	
January 27, 2024	MF	(Bulgaria) Filip Krastev	(Belgium) Lommel	Loan terminated	
July 8, 2024	FW	(Croatia) Stipe Biuk	(Spain) Real Valladolid	Exercised option to buy	
July 22, 2024	DF	(Senegal) Mamadou Fall	(Spain) Barcelona	Exercised option to buy	
August 8, 2024	MF	(Uruguay) Francisco Ginella		Contract terminated	
August 14, 2024	GK	(Mexico) Abraham Romero	(United States) Columbus Crew	Trade	

=== Loans in ===
Position	Player	From Club	Start date	End date	Notes	Ref.
MF	(Colombia) Eduard Atuesta	(Brazil) Palmeiras	February 8, 2024	December 31, 2024	Year-long loan with purchase option	
MF	(England) Lewis O'Brien	(England) Nottingham Forest	July 30, 2024	December 31, 2024	Short-term loan with purchase option	

=== Out on loan ===
No.	Player	To Club	Start date	End date	Notes	Ref.
—	(Spain) Mario González	(Portugal) Famalicão	August 2, 2024	June 30, 2025	Short-term loan with purchase option	
21	(Colombia) Tomás Ángel	(United States) Phoenix Rising	August 2, 2024	December 31, 2024	Short-term loan	

=== Draft picks ===
Round	#	Position	Player	College/Club Team	Reference	Status
1	#28	GK	(Australia) Jackson Lee	West Virginia University		Signed with Rhode Island FC
2	#57	DF	(United States) Kenny Nielsen	Georgetown University		Signed with Los Angeles FC 2

== Competitions ==
Win Draw Loss

All matches are in Pacific Time

=== Preseason ===
January 28 Friendly	Los Angeles FC	1–3	Nordsjælland	Los Angeles
				Stadium: Los Angeles FC Training Grounds; Attendance: 0
Note: Match was played behind closed doors.

February 3 Friendly	Los Angeles FC	2–2	Charlotte FC	Los Angeles
				Stadium: Los Angeles FC Training Grounds; Attendance: 0
Note: Match was played behind closed doors.

February 17 Friendly	Los Angeles FC	1–0	Toronto FC	Los Angeles
	Bouanga			Stadium: Los Angeles FC Training Grounds; Attendance: 0

==== Coachella Valley Invitational ====
February 7 1	Los Angeles FC	0–1	St. Louis City SC	Indio, California
				Stadium: Empire Polo Club

February 11 2	Los Angeles FC	3–1	Chicago Fire	Indio, California
	Bouanga; Olivera; Ordaz		Herbers	Stadium: Empire Polo Club

=== MLS ===
==== Standings ====
===== Western Conference =====
MLS Western Conference table (2024)
Pos	Team	Pld	W	L	T	GF	GA	GD	Pts	Qualification
1	Los Angeles FC	34	19	8	7	63	43	+20	64	Qualification for round one, the 2025 Leagues Cup and the CONCACAF Champions Cup round one
2	LA Galaxy	34	19	8	7	69	50	+19	64	Qualification for round one and the 2025 Leagues Cup
3	Real Salt Lake	34	16	7	11	65	48	+17	59	Qualification for round one and the 2025 Leagues Cup
4	Seattle Sounders FC	34	16	9	9	51	35	+16	57	Qualification for round one and the 2025 Leagues Cup
5	Houston Dynamo FC	34	15	10	9	47	39	+8	54	Qualification for round one and the 2025 Leagues Cup

Source: MLS
Rules for classification: 1) points; 2) total wins; 3) total goal differential; 4) total goals scored; 5) fewer disciplinary points; 6) away goal differential; 7) away goals scored; 8) home goals differential; 9) home goals scored; 10) coin toss (2 clubs tied) or drawing of lots (≥3 clubs tied)

===== Overall =====
Overall MLS standings table
Pos	Team	Pld	W	L	T	GF	GA	GD	Pts	Qualification
1	Inter Miami CF (S)	34	22	4	8	79	49	+30	74	Qualification for the 2025 FIFA Club World Cup group stage and CONCACAF Champions Cup Round One (Note: As 2024 MLS Supporters' Shield champions)
2	Columbus Crew (L)	34	19	6	9	72	40	+32	66	Qualification for the CONCACAF Champions Cup Round of 16 (Note: As winners of Leagues Cup)
3	Los Angeles FC (U)	34	19	8	7	63	43	+20	64	Qualification for the CONCACAF Champions Cup Round One (Note: As runners-up of Leagues Cup)
4	LA Galaxy (C)	34	19	8	7	69	50	+19	64	Qualification for the CONCACAF Champions Cup Round of 16 (Note: As 2024 MLS Cup champions)
5	FC Cincinnati	34	18	11	5	58	48	+10	59	Qualification for the CONCACAF Champions Cup Round One (Note: As highest-ranked club in 2024 MLS Supporters' Shield not already qualified)

Source: MLS
Rules for classification: 1) points; 2) total wins; 3) total goal differential; 4) total goals scored; 5) fewer disciplinary points; 6) away goal differential; 7) away goals scored; 8) home goals differential; 9) home goals scored; 10) coin toss (2 clubs tied) or drawing of lots (≥3 clubs tied)
(C) MLS Cup champions; (L) Leagues Cup winners; (S) Supporters' Shield winners; (U) U.S. Open Cup winners

==== Matches ====
All matches are in Pacific time

February 24 1	Los Angeles FC	2–1	Seattle Sounders FC	Los Angeles
1:30 pm PST	Tillman 45', (yellow card) 89'; Bogusz 55'; Long (yellow card) 72'	Report	C. Roldan (yellow card) 37'; Nouhou (yellow card) 66'; de la Vega 72' (pen.)	Stadium: BMO Stadium; Attendance: 22,214; Referee: Wesley Costa

March 2 2	Real Salt Lake	3–0	Los Angeles FC	Sandy, Utah
1:00 pm PST	Gómez 18', 41'; Ojeda (yellow card) 37' (yellow-red card) 86'; Arango 45+5', (yellow card) 59'	Report	Atuesta (yellow card) 35'; Murillo (yellow card) 50'; Bogusz (yellow card) 68'	Stadium: America First Field; Attendance: 19,509; Referee: Aleksandar Zhelyazkov
Note: Kickoff was delayed due to severe weather.

March 9 3	Los Angeles FC	0–0	Sporting Kansas City	Los Angeles
7:30 pm PST	Campos (yellow card) 31'; Atuesta (yellow card) 88'	Report	Rodríguez (yellow card) 27'; Fontàs (yellow card) 49'; Rosero (yellow card) 60'; Davis (yellow card) 90+2'	Stadium: BMO Stadium; Attendance: 22,175; Referee: Lorenzo Hernandez

March 16 4	Minnesota United FC	2–0	Los Angeles FC	Saint Paul, Minnesota
5:30 pm PDT	Lod 16'; Clark (yellow card) 32'; Oluwaseyi (yellow card) 86'; Hlongwane 88'	Report	Murillo (yellow card) 22'; Atuesta (yellow card) 90+3'	Stadium: Allianz Field; Attendance: 19,315; Referee: Kyle Johnston

March 23 5	Los Angeles FC	5–0	Nashville SC	Los Angeles
7:30 pm PDT	Tillman 9'; Bouanga 18' (pen.), 48'; Hollingshead (yellow card) 39'; Palencia (yellow card) 42'; Atuesta (yellow card) 52', (goal) 90+6'; Olivera 75'; Ordaz (yellow card) 90'	Report	Moore (yellow card) 7'; Yearwood (yellow card) 43'; Willis (red card) 62'	Stadium: BMO Stadium; Attendance: 22,000; Referee: Erick Lezama

March 30 6	Colorado Rapids	3–2	Los Angeles FC	Commerce City, Colorado
1:00 pm PDT	Harris (yellow card) 33'; Bombito 38'; Mihailovic (yellow card) 56', (goal) 83', 89'; Navarro (yellow card) 90+7'	Report	Atuesta 8'; Tillman (yellow card) 43'; Martínez 76', (yellow card) 78' (yellow-red card) 85'; Segura (yellow card) 81'	Stadium: Dick's Sporting Goods Park; Attendance: 14,368; Referee: Armando Villarreal

April 6 7	Los Angeles FC	2–1	LA Galaxy	Los Angeles
4:30 pm PDT	Tillman 4', (yellow card) 21'; Bouanga 35' (pen.); Murillo (yellow card) 44'; Hollingshead (yellow card) 61'; Palencia (yellow card) 75'	Report	Aude 29'	Stadium: BMO Stadium; Attendance: 22,321; Referee: Jon Freemon

April 13 8	Portland Timbers	2–2	Los Angeles FC	Portland, Oregon
1:45 pm PDT	Mora 11', (yellow card) 14'; Evander 34', (yellow card) 40'; Crépeau (red card) 48'	Report	Bogusz 21', 51', (yellow card) 76'; Palencia (yellow card) 44'; Bouanga (yellow card) 45+3'; Sánchez (yellow card) 45+4'; Hollingshead (yellow card) 71'; Atuesta (yellow card) 87'	Stadium: Providence Park; Attendance: 23,245; Referee: Rubiel Vazquez

April 20 9	Los Angeles FC	2–2	New York Red Bulls	Los Angeles
7:30 pm PDT	Bouanga 67', 90+5'	Report	Segura 8' (o.g.); Eile (yellow card) 28'; Forsberg 81'; Amaya (yellow card) 85'	Stadium: BMO Stadium; Attendance: 22,122; Referee: Guido Gonzales, Jr.

April 27 10	Los Angeles FC	3–2	Portland Timbers	Los Angeles
7:30 pm PDT	K. Miller 44' (o.g.); Tillman 45+4'; Bogusz (yellow card) 48'; Sánchez (yellow card) 54'; Chanot (yellow card) 75'; Kamara (yellow card) 89'; Bouanga 90+2'	Report	Bravo (yellow card) 52'; Rodríguez (yellow card) 55', (goal) 65'; Williamson (yellow card) 68'; Chará (yellow card) 72' (yellow-red card) 76'; Moreno 73'; E. Miller (yellow card) 90+6'	Stadium: BMO Stadium; Attendance: 22,032; Referee: Ismail Elfath

May 4 11	San Jose Earthquakes	3–1	Los Angeles FC	Santa Clara, California
4:30 pm PDT	Rodrigues 5'; Skahan (yellow card) 10'; Pellegrino 55'; Bouanga 59' (o.g.); Costa (yellow card) 75'	Report	Chanot (yellow card) 25'; Palencia (yellow card) 61'; Olivera 69'	Stadium: Levi's Stadium; Attendance: 43,774; Referee: Victor Rivas

May 11 12	Los Angeles FC	3–0	Vancouver Whitecaps FC	Los Angeles
7:30 pm PDT	Olivera 18', 36'; Bogusz (yellow card) 45+2', (goal) 57'	Report	White (yellow card) 21'	Stadium: BMO Stadium; Attendance: 22,099; Referee: Ted Unkel

May 15 13	St. Louis City SC	0–2	Los Angeles FC	St. Louis, Missouri
5:30 pm PDT	Markanich (yellow card) 27' (yellow-red card) 75'; Pompeu (yellow card) 58'; Blom (yellow card) 82'; Jackson (yellow card) 84'; Vassilev (yellow card) 90+2'	Report	Tillman (yellow card) 45+6'; Bouanga 59', 90+5'; Dueñas (yellow card) 86'	Stadium: CityPark; Referee: Joe Dickerson

May 25 14	Atlanta United FC	0–1	Los Angeles FC	Atlanta, Georgia
4:30 pm PDT	Lennon (yellow card) 26'; Guzan (red card) 60'; Mosquera (yellow card) 77'	Report	Atuesta (yellow card) 10' (yellow-red card) 81'; Bogusz 63'	Stadium: Mercedes-Benz Stadium; Attendance: 43,128; Referee: Sergii Boiko

May 29 15	Los Angeles FC	2–0	Minnesota United FC	Los Angeles
7:30 pm PDT	Bouanga 38' (pen.); Bogusz 82'	Report	Trapp (yellow card) 36'; Adebayo-Smith (yellow card) 80'	Stadium: BMO Stadium; Referee: Timothy Ford

June 1 16	Los Angeles FC	1–0	FC Dallas	Los Angeles
7:30 pm PDT	Chanot (yellow card) 37'; Bouanga 74'	Report	Delgado (yellow card) 44'; Musa (yellow card) 45+2'; Ibeagha (yellow card) 66'; Arriola (yellow card) 79'	Stadium: BMO Stadium; Attendance: 22,105; Referee: Lukasz Szpala

June 15 17	Orlando City SC	1–3	Los Angeles FC	Orlando, Florida
4:30 pm PDT	Thórhallsson (yellow card) 66'; Ojeda 69'	Report	Bouanga 45', 86', (yellow card) 56'; Bogusz 80'	Stadium: Inter&Co Stadium; Attendance: 22,563; Referee: Rubiel Vazquez

June 19 18	Austin FC	1–1	Los Angeles FC	Austin, Texas
5:30 pm PDT	Obrian 19'; Driussi (yellow card) 58'; Biro (yellow card) 60'; Valencia (yellow card) 63'	Report	Dueñas (yellow card) 4'; Segura (yellow card) 20'; Tillman (yellow card) 69'; Kamara 90'	Stadium: Q2 Stadium; Attendance: 20,738; Referee: Ted Unkel

June 22 19	Los Angeles FC	6–2	San Jose Earthquakes	Los Angeles
7:30 pm PDT	Bogusz 15', 48'; Bouanga 26'; Kamara 33'; Hollingshead 42'; Ángel 87'	Report	Rodrigues 45+3'; Costa (yellow card) 46'; Kikanović 57'	Stadium: BMO Stadium; Attendance: 22,146; Referee: Segrii Boiko

June 29 20	Los Angeles FC	3–0	Colorado Rapids	Los Angeles
7:30 pm PDT	Bogusz 20', 58', 72'; Murillo (yellow card) 41'	Report	Cabral (yellow card) 3' (yellow-red card) 62'; Navarro (yellow card) 36'; Abubakar (yellow card) 41'; Löffelsend (yellow card) 83'	Stadium: BMO Stadium; Attendance: 22,019; Referee: Chris Penso

July 4 21	LA Galaxy	1–2	Los Angeles FC	Pasadena, California
7:30 pm PDT	Cerrillo (yellow card) 22'; Pec 56'; Puig (yellow card) 90+1'	Report	Kamara 39'; Bouanga 44' (pen.); Tillman (yellow card) 63'	Stadium: Rose Bowl; Attendance: 70,076; Referee: Drew Fischer

July 13 22	Los Angeles FC	1–5	Columbus Crew	Los Angeles
7:30 pm PDT	Palencia (yellow card) 41' (yellow-red card) 83'; Dueñas (yellow card) 63'; Sánchez (yellow card) 65'; Ordaz 85'; Murillo (red card) 90+7'	Report	Ramirez 38', 84'; Hernández 56'; Rossi 60'; Mățan 89'; Hinestroza (red card) 90+7'	Stadium: BMO Stadium; Attendance: 22,127; Referee: Lukasz Szpala

July 17 23	Los Angeles FC	1–1	Real Salt Lake	Los Angeles
7:30 pm PDT	Olivera 5'; Kamara (yellow card) 41'; Hollingshead (yellow card) 60'	Report	Luna (yellow card) 8'; Vera 33'; Katranis (yellow card) 66'; Chang (yellow card) 71'; Palacio (yellow card) 74'; Glad (yellow card) 90+3'	Stadium: BMO Stadium; Attendance: 22,163; Referee: Guido Gonzales, Jr.

July 20 24	Seattle Sounders FC	0–3	Los Angeles FC	Seattle, Washington
7:30 pm PDT	Nouhou (yellow card) 14'; João Paulo (yellow card) 45+9'; Rothrock (yellow card) 55'	Report	Bouanga 16' (pen.), 74'; Bogusz 26' (yellow card) 62'; Murillo (yellow card) 85'	Stadium: Lumen Field; Attendance: 32,905; Referee: Allen Chapman

August 31 25	Los Angeles FC	0–2	Houston Dynamo	Los Angeles
7:30 pm PDT	Bouanga (yellow card) 36'; Palencia (yellow card) 55'	Report	Ponce 28' (yellow card) 53'; Escobar (yellow card) 33'; Dorsey (yellow card) 34'; Herrera (yellow card) 49'; Ennali 72'	Stadium: BMO Stadium; Attendance: 22,176; Referee: Armando Villarreal

September 7 26	Houston Dynamo	0–0	Los Angeles FC	Houston, Texas
5:30 pm PDT	Herrera (yellow card) 45+5'; Artur (yellow card) 55'; Micael (yellow card) 78'; Escobar (yellow card) 85'	Report	Sánchez (yellow card) 25'; Atuesta (yellow card) 52'; O'Brien (yellow card) 56'	Stadium: Shell Energy Stadium; Referee: Guido Gonzales Jr.
Note: Game postponed from July 7 due to inclement weather.

September 14 27	LA Galaxy	4–2	Los Angeles FC	Carson, California
7:30 pm PDT	Fagúndez (yellow card) 35'; Neal (yellow card) 37'; Pec (yellow card) 49'; Joveljic 53' 67'; Cerrillo 55' (yellow card) 89'; Puig (yellow card) 86' (goal) 86'	Report	Bogusz 4'; Bouanga 15'; Sánchez (yellow card) 45+3'; Long (yellow card) 71'; O'Brien (red card)	Stadium: Dignity Health Sports Park; Attendance: 25,174; Referee: Ted Unkel

September 18 28	Los Angeles FC	1–1	Austin FC	Los Angeles
7:30 pm PDT	Segura (yellow card) 45+1'; Atuesta (yellow card) 49'; Martínez 62'; Tillman (yellow card) 85'	Report	Rubio (yellow card) 31'; Obrian 45+2'; Fodrey (yellow card) 88'	Stadium: BMO Stadium; Attendance: 22,153; Referee: Allen Chapman

September 21 29	FC Dallas	3–1	Los Angeles FC	Frisco, Texas
5:30 pm PDT	Velasco (yellow card) 20'; Musa 28'; Gonzalez (yellow card) 50'; Delgado 60'; Farrington 62'; Illarramendi (yellow card) 85'	Report	Segura (yellow card) 57'; Atuesta 86'; Long (yellow card) 90+3'	Stadium: Toyota Stadium; Attendance: 19,096; Referee: Alexis Da Silva

September 28 30	FC Cincinnati	1–2	Los Angeles FC	Cincinnati, Ohio
7:30 pm PDT	Orellano 61'	Report	Chanot (yellow card) 5'; Palencia (yellow card) 29'; Martínez 34'; Bouanga 73'; Marlon (yellow card) 86'; Lloris (yellow card) 90+9'	Stadium: TQL Stadium; Attendance: 24,728; Referee: Ismir Pekmic

October 2 31	Los Angeles FC	1–0	St. Louis City SC	Los Angeles
7:30 pm PDT	Bogusz (yellow card) 8'; Chanot (yellow card) 12'; Bouanga 45+1'	Report	Hartel (yellow card) 7'; Becher (yellow card) 90+5'	Stadium: BMO Stadium; Attendance: 22,064; Referee: Victor Rivas

October 5 32	Sporting Kansas City	0–3	Los Angeles FC	Kansas City, Kansas
5:30 pm PDT	Rodríguez (yellow card) 25'		Martínez 14'; Tillman (yellow card) 25'; Olivera 45+1', (yellow card) 79'; Long 69'	Stadium: Children's Mercy Park; Attendance: 18,554; Referee: Marcos DeOliveira

October 13 33	Vancouver Whitecaps FC	1–2	Los Angeles FC	Vancouver, British Columbia
4:30 pm PDT	Palencia 62' (o.g.); Sartini (yellow card) 90+5'	Report	Bogusz 1'; Palencia (yellow card) 62'; Sánchez 90+3'	Stadium: BC Place; Attendance: 30,303; Referee: Drew Fischer
Note: Game rescheduled from August 24 due to Los Angeles FC's participation in the Leagues Cup final.

October 19 34	Los Angeles FC	3–1	San Jose Earthquakes	Los Angeles
6:00 pm PDT	Bouanga 64'; Atuesta 75'; Marlon 90+1'	Report	Yueill 9'; Rodrigues (yellow card) 31'; Akapo (yellow card) 53'; Verhoeven (yellow card) 85'	Stadium: BMO Stadium; Attendance: 22,137; Referee: Pierre-Luc Lauziere

=== MLS Cup playoffs ===
==== Round One ====
October 27 First leg	Los Angeles FC	2–1	Vancouver Whitecaps FC	Los Angeles
6:45 p.m. PDT	Bouanga 30' (pen.); Olivera 57'; Hollingshead (yellow card) 58'; Long (yellow card) 58'	Report	Laborda (yellow card) 73'; Veselinović (yellow card) 90'; Gauld 90+5'	Stadium: BMO Stadium; Attendance: 22,298; Referee: Jair Marrufo

November 3 Second leg	Vancouver Whitecaps FC	3–0	Los Angeles FC	Vancouver, British Columbia
5:45 p.m. PST	Gauld 10'; Hollingshead 13' (o.g.); Ahmed (yellow card) 50'; Berhalter (yellow card) 57'; Segura 68' (o.g.)	Report	Bouanga (yellow card) 41'; Murillo (yellow card) 84'; Segura (yellow card) 89'	Stadium: BC Place; Attendance: 20,695; Referee: Rosendo Mendoza

November 8 Third leg	Los Angeles FC	1–0	Vancouver Whitecaps FC	Los Angeles
8:00 p.m. PDT	Bogusz 62'; Hollingshead (yellow card) 88'	Report	Gauld (yellow card) 90+3'	Stadium: BMO Stadium; Attendance: 22,220; Referee: Joe Dickerson
Note: Los Angeles FC won the series 2–1.

==== Conference Semifinals ====
November 23 Conference Semifinals	Los Angeles FC	1–2 (a.e.t.)	Seattle Sounders FC	Los Angeles
7:30 p.m. PST	Chanot (yellow card) 42'; Hollingshead 50'; Bogusz (yellow card) 77'	Report	Chanot 59' (o.g.); Yeimar (yellow card) 95'; Morris 109'; João Paulo (yellow card) 112'	Stadium: BMO Stadium; Attendance: 22,301; Referee: Guido Gonzales Jr.

=== U.S. Open Cup ===
All matches are in Pacific Time.

May 8 Round of 32	Las Vegas Lights (Nevada)	1–3	(California) Los Angeles FC	Las Vegas, Nevada
7:30 pm PDT	Noël (yellow card) 10'; Azcona (yellow card) 45+2'; Smart 56'	Report	Atuesta (yellow card) 21'; Kamara 47'; Olivera 70', 90+1'; Sánchez (yellow card) 89'	Stadium: Cashman Field; Referee: James Duling
Note: Los Angeles FC head coach Steve Cherundolo was sent off in the first half (45+2').

May 21 Round of 16	Los Angeles FC (California)	3–0	(Virginia) Loudoun United	Los Angeles
7:30 pm PDT	Tillman 8'; Palencia (yellow card) 38'; Olivera 52'; Campos (yellow card) 56'; Ángel 61'	Report	Legget (yellow card) 18'; Dambrot (yellow card) 41'	Stadium: BMO Stadium; Attendance: 22,000; Referee: Geoff Cameron

July 10 Quarter-finals	Los Angeles FC (California)	3–1	New Mexico United	Los Angeles
8:00 pm PDT	Tillman 6'; Martínez 37'; Bogusz 77'		Houssou (yellow card) 20'; Micaletto (yellow card) 22'; Hurst 57'	Stadium: BMO Stadium; Referee: Allen Chapman

August 28 Semi-finals	Seattle Sounders FC (Washington (state))	0–1	(California) Los Angeles FC	Tukwila, Washington
7:30 pm PDT	Yeimar (yellow card) 50'; de la Vega (yellow card) 83'	Report	Long (yellow card) 45+1'; Bouanga 83' (pen.), (yellow card) 90+4'; Palencia (yellow card) 90+3'	Stadium: Starfire Sports; Attendance: 4,109; Referee: Ricardo Fierro

September 25 Final	Los Angeles FC (California)	3–1 (a.e.t.)	Sporting Kansas City	Los Angeles
7:30 pm PDT	Giroud 53', (yellow card) 55'; Segura (yellow card) 64'; Campos (yellow card) 72', (goal) 102'; Hollingshead (yellow card) 92'; Kamara 109'		Russell (yellow card) 43'; Bassong (yellow card) 58'; Thommy 60'; Rodríguez (yellow card) 119'	Stadium: BMO Stadium; Referee: Armando Villarreal

=== Leagues Cup ===
==== West 7 ====
Pos	Team	Pld	W	PW	PL	L	GF	GA	GD	Pts	Qualification	VAN	LFC	TIJ
1	(Canadian Soccer Association) Vancouver Whitecaps FC	2	1	1	0	0	5	3	+2	5	Advance to knockout stage	—	—	3–1
2	(United States Soccer Federation) Los Angeles FC	2	1	0	1	0	5	2	+3	4	Advance to knockout stage	2–2	—	3–0
3	(Mexican Football Federation) Tijuana	2	0	0	0	2	1	6	−5	0		—	—	—

Source: Leagues Cup
Rules for classification: Tiebreakers

July 26 Group stage	Los Angeles FC (United States)	3–0	(Mexico) Tijuana	Los Angeles
8:00 pm PDT	Olivera 9', 51'; Segura (yellow card) 15'; Campos (yellow card) 37'; Bouanga 43'; Long (yellow card) 45+10'; Atuesta (yellow card) 69'	Report	Balanta (yellow card) 26'; Díaz (yellow card) 56'	Stadium: BMO Stadium; Referee: Iván Barton (El Salvador)
Note: Tijuana head coach Juan Carlos Osorio was ejected from the match during the first half.

July 30 Group stage	Los Angeles FC (United States)	2–2 (2–4 p)	(Canada) Vancouver Whitecaps FC	Los Angeles
7:30 pm PDT	Olivera (yellow card) 80'; Kamara 88'; Martínez (yellow card) 90'; Bogusz 90+5'	Report	Berhalter 5'; Ahmed (yellow card) 13'; Veselinović 17'; Halbouni (yellow card) 53'; Berhalter (yellow card) 90+1'	Stadium: BMO Stadium; Attendance: 18,351; Referee: Cesar Ramos
	Penalties
	Atuesta (penalty scored); Kamara (penalty missed); Bogusz (penalty missed); Olivera (penalty scored)		(penalty scored) Kreilach; (penalty scored) Berhalter; (penalty scored) Raposo; (penalty scored) Laborda

==== Knockout stage ====
August 7 Round of 32	Los Angeles FC (United States)	2–0	(United States) Austin FC	Los Angeles
7:30 pm PDT	Bouanga 11'; Martínez (yellow card) 45+2'; Olivera 61'	Report		Stadium: BMO Stadium; Referee: Jon Freemon

August 13 Round of 16	Los Angeles FC (United States)	4–1	(United States) San Jose Earthquakes	Los Angeles
7:30 p.m. PDT	Olivera 17'; Bouanga 45+5' (pen.), 66'; Bogusz 61'	Report	López 41'; Yarbrough (yellow card) 45+2'	Stadium: BMO Stadium; Referee: Pierre-Luc Lauziere

August 17 Quarterfinals	Seattle Sounders FC (United States)	0–3	(United States) Los Angeles FC	Seattle, Washington
--:-- p.m. PDT	C. Roldan (yellow card) 60'	Report	Hollingshead 14'; Kamara 25'; Bouanga 53'	Stadium: Lumen Field; Attendance: 19,643; Referee: César Ramos

August 21 Semifinals	Los Angeles FC (United States)	4–0	(United States) Colorado Rapids	Los Angeles
--:-- p.m. PDT	Bogusz 42'; Kamara 45'; Bouanga 59'; O'Brien 75'; Olivera (yellow card) 87'	Report	Abubakar (yellow card) 84'	Stadium: BMO Stadium; Referee: Mario Escobar

August 25 Final	Columbus Crew (United States)	3–1	(United States) Los Angeles FC	Columbus, Ohio
4:15 pp.m. PST	Camacho (yellow card) 11'; Hernández 45', 90+2'; Russell-Rowe 90+4'	Report	Atuesta (yellow card) 37'; Chanot (yellow card) 49'; Giroud 57'	Stadium: Lower.com Field; Attendance: 20,190; Referee: Oshane Nation (Jamaica)

== Statistics ==
=== Squad appearances and goals ===
As of January 1, 2024

No.	Pos	Nat	Player	Total		Major League Soccer		U.S. Open Cup		Leagues Cup	
No.	Pos	Nat	Player	Apps	Goals	Apps	Goals	Apps	Goals	Apps	Goals
Goalkeepers
1	GK	(Switzerland) SUI	Eldin Jakupović	0	0	0	0	0	0	0	0
12	GK	(Canada) CAN	Thomas Hasal	0	0	0	0	0	0	0	0
31	GK	(Mexico) MEX	David Ochoa	0	0	0	0	0	0	0	0
Defenders
2	DF	(Mexico) MEX	Omar Campos	0	0	0	0	0	0	0	0
3	DF	(Colombia) COL	Jesús David Murillo	0	0	0	0	0	0	0	0
4	DF	(Colombia) COL	Eddie Segura	0	0	0	0	0	0	0	0
5	DF	(Brazil) BRA	Marlon	0	0	0	0	0	0	0	0
14	DF	(Spain) ESP	Sergi Palencia	0	0	0	0	0	0	0	0
15	DF	(Italy) ITA	Lorenzo Dellavalle	0	0	0	0	0	0	0	0
24	DF	(United States) USA	Ryan Hollingshead	0	0	0	0	0	0	0	0
25	DF	(Luxembourg) LUX	Maxime Chanot	0	0	0	0	0	0	0	0
33	DF	(United States) USA	Aaron Long	0	0	0	0	0	0	0	0
42	DF	(United States) USA	Luca Bombino	0	0	0	0	0	0	0	0
43	DF	(United States) USA	Diego Rosales	0	0	0	0	0	0	0	0
Midfielders
6	MF	(Spain) ESP	Ilie Sánchez	0	0	0	0	0	0	0	0
8	MF	(England) ENG	Lewis O'Brien	0	0	0	0	0	0	0	0
11	MF	(United States) USA	Timothy Tillman	0	0	0	0	0	0	0	0
18	MF	(United States) USA	Erik Dueñas	0	0	0	0	0	0	0	0
19	MF	(Poland) POL	Mateusz Bogusz	0	0	0	0	0	0	0	0
20	MF	(Colombia) COL	Eduard Atuesta	0	0	0	0	0	0	0	0
36	MF	(United States) USA	Tommy Musto	0	0	0	0	0	0	0	0
55	MF	(United States) USA	Bajung Darboe	0	0	0	0	0	0	0	0
Forwards
9	FW	(France) FRA	Olivier Giroud	0	0	0	0	0	0	0	0
10	FW	(Mexico) MEX	Carlos Vela	0	0	0	0	0	0	0	0
13	FW	(Uruguay) URU	Cristian Olivera	0	0	0	0	0	0	0	0
23	FW	(Sierra Leone) SLE	Kei Kamara	0	0	0	0	0	0	0	0
27	FW	(El Salvador) SLV	Nathan Ordaz	0	0	0	0	0	0	0	0
30	FW	(Venezuela) VEN	David Martínez	0	0	0	0	0	0	0	0
77	FW	(United States) USA	Adrian Wibowo	0	0	0	0	0	0	0	0
91	FW	(Germany) GER	Luis Müller	0	0	0	0	0	0	0	0
99	FW	(Gabon) GAB	Denis Bouanga	0	0	0	0	0	0	0	0
Players who made an appearance this season but left the club
