= 2025 Los Angeles FC season =

Los Angeles FC
2025 season
- General manager: John Thorrington
- Head coach: Steve Cherundolo
- Stadium: BMO Stadium
- MLS: Conference: 3rd Overall: 6th
- MLS Cup Playoffs: Conference semifinals
- Leagues Cup: League stage
- CONCACAF Champions Cup: Quarter-finals
- FIFA Club World Cup: Group stage
- Top goalscorer: League: Denis Bouanga (24); All: Denis Bouanga (32)
- Average home league attendance: 21,931
Home colors	Away colors

The 2025 Los Angeles FC season was the club's eighth season in Major League Soccer, the top tier of the American soccer pyramid. LAFC played its home matches at BMO Stadium in the Exposition Park neighborhood of Los Angeles, California. It was the final season under head coach Steve Cherundolo, who stepped down at the end of the season.

== Background ==
Since joining MLS in 2018, LAFC has won the 2022 MLS Cup and twice won the Supporters' Shield in 2019 and 2022. LAFC was also a finalist for the 2023 MLS Cup and twice a runner-up for the final of the CONCACAF Champions League in 2020 and 2023. LAFC finished the 2024 regular season at the top of the Western Conference and advanced to the 2024 MLS Cup Playoffs; their playoff run ended when they lost to the Seattle Sounders in the conference semifinals. LAFC also won their first U.S. Open Cup and were finalists in the 2024 Leagues Cup which allowed them to qualify for the 2025 CONCACAF Champions Cup. LAFC finished 2024 with a record of 31 wins, 11 losses, and 8 draws.

== Summary ==
=== Preseason ===
On November 27, 2024, LAFC announced they were exercising contract options to retain five players while declining options for six players including Carlos Vela, Kei Kamara, and Marlon. They also reported Aaron Long, Jesús Murillo, Ilie Sánchez, and Erik Dueñas were out of contract while the loan terms for Eduard Atuesta and Lewis O'Brien expired at the end of the year. LAFC signed Long and Marlon to new contracts before the end of 2024. LAFC also transferred Bajung Darboe to Bundesliga club FC Bayern Munich and traded Tomás Ángel to San Diego FC along with LAFC's second-round pick in the 2025 MLS SuperDraft in exchange for $200,000 in general allocation money.

On December 10, 2024, LAFC signed Jude Terry from their youth academy to a homegrown contract. They also signed Jeremy Ebobisse as a free agent on December 23, 2024, and selected Alec Hughes as the 22nd pick of the 2025 MLS SuperDraft. On January 5, 2025, LAFC announced Omar Campos had transferred to Liga MX club Cruz Azul. The next day, LAFC announced they had acquired two 2025 international roster slots from Nashville SC in exchange for $350,000 in general allocation money. LAFC made a number of player acquisitions in January. They acquired Odin Thiago Holm on loan from Scottish Premier League club Celtic FC for the 2025 season and Igor Jesus from Primeira Liga club Estrela da Amadora as an U22 Initiative signing. They also made trades to acquire midfielder Mark Delgado from the LA Galaxy in exchange for $400,000 in general allocation money and defender Nkosi Tafari from FC Dallas in exchange for $300,000 in general allocation money and a 2026 international roster slot. On January 24, LAFC signed former Columbus Crew midfielder Yaw Yeboah for a two-year contract after acquiring first refusal rights from San Diego FC with $50,000 in general allocation money. The next day, LAFC announced the transfer of midfielder Mateusz Bogusz to Cruz Azul.

LAFC began their preseason schedule with a closed-door friendly against CPL club Cavalry FC on January 20. They then play two closed-door friendlies at BMO Stadium against the San Jose Earthquakes on January 25 and the Portland Timbers on January 29. On February 2, LAFC heads to Indio where they will play a friendly against USL Championship club Phoenix Rising FC. They will then participate in the 2025 Coachella Valley Invitational at the Empire Polo Club by playing a preseason match against the Chicago Fire FC on February 5 before heading back to BMO Stadium for a friendly against Liga MX's Club América on February 11. On February 18, LAFC will travel to Colorado to play the Colorado Rapids in the first round of the 2025 CONCACAF Champions Cup; the second leg of the first round will be played in Los Angeles on February 25. LAFC's regular season will begin with a home match against Minnesota United FC on February 22. While LAFC will participate in the 2025 Leagues Cup which runs from July 29 to August 31, LAFC will not compete in the 2025 U.S. Open Cup with MLS Next Pro team Los Angeles FC 2 taking their place.

== Squad ==
=== First-team roster ===
As of October 18, 2025

No.	Name	Nationality	Pos	Date of birth (age)	Apps	Goals
1	Hugo Lloris	France	GK	December 26, 1986 (age 39)	32	0
12	Thomas Hasal	Canada	GK	July 9, 1999 (age 27)	2	0
18	David Ochoa	Mexico	GK	January 16, 2001 (age 25)	1	0
4	Eddie Segura	Colombia	DF	February 2, 1997 (age 29)	31	1
5	Ryan Porteous	Scotland	DF	March 25, 1999 (age 27)	10	0
14	Sergi Palencia	Spain	DF	March 23, 1996 (age 30)	33	1
15	Lorenzo Dellavalle	Italy	DF	April 4, 2004 (age 22)	0	0
24	Ryan Hollingshead	United States	DF	April 16, 1991 (age 35)	31	2
25	Maxime Chanot	Luxembourg	DF	November 21, 1989 (age 36)	1	0
29	Artem Smolyakov	Ukraine	DF	May 29, 2003 (age 23)	26	1
33	Aaron Long	United States	DF	October 12, 1992 (age 33)	14	1
42	Luca Bombino (HG)	United States	DF	July 10, 2006 (age 20)	0	0
45	Kenny Nielsen	United States	DF	February 13, 2002 (age 24)	2	0
91	Nkosi Tafari	United States	DF	March 23, 1997 (age 29)	25	0
6	Igor Jesus	Brazil	MF	March 7, 2003 (age 23)	24	0
8	Mark Delgado	United States	MF	May 16, 1995 (age 31)	34	3
11	Timothy Tillman	United States	MF	January 4, 1999 (age 27)	30	0
16	Jailson	Brazil	MF	September 7, 1995 (age 30)	3	0
19	Andrew Moran	Ireland	MF	October 15, 2003 (age 22)	8	1
20	Yaw Yeboah	Ghana	MF	March 28, 1997 (age 29)	17	1
21	Ryan Raposo	Canada	MF	March 5, 1999 (age 27)	5	0
23	Frankie Amaya	United States	MF	September 26, 2000 (age 25)	19	1
43	Adam Saldana	United States	MF	February 7, 2002 (age 24)	2	0
56	Jude Terry (HG)	United States	MF	October 8, 2008 (age 17)	0	0
66	Mathieu Choinière	Canada	MF	February 7, 1999 (age 27)	9	1
80	Odin Thiago Holm	Norway	MF	January 18, 2003 (age 23)	3	0
7	Son Heung-min	South Korea	FW	8 July 1992 (aged 32)	10	9
17	Jeremy Ebobisse	United States	FW	February 14, 1997 (age 29)	22	4
22	Alexandru Băluță	Romania	FW	September 13, 1993 (age 32)	1	0
26	Javairô Dilrosun	Netherlands	FW	June 22, 1998 (age 28)	6	2
27	Nathan Ordaz (HG)	El Salvador	FW	January 12, 2004 (age 22)	26	5
30	David Martínez	Venezuela	FW	February 7, 2006 (age 20)	30	3
77	Adrian Wibowo (HG)	Indonesia	FW	January 17, 2006 (age 20)	2	0
99	Denis Bouanga	Gabon	FW	November 11, 1994 (age 31)	31	24

=== Los Angeles FC 2 players that made MLS appearances ===
No.	Name	Nationality	Pos	Date of birth (age)	Apps	Goals

== Coaching staff ==
As of May 13, 2024

Technical staff
Head coach	(United States) Steve Cherundolo
Assistant coach	(Canada) Marc Dos Santos
Assistant coach	(United States) Ante Razov
Assistant coach	(Spain) Enrique Duran
Assistant/Goalkeeping coach	(North Macedonia) Oka Nikolov
Assistant coach/Performance director	(South Africa) Gavin Benjafield
Co-President & General Manager	(United States) John Thorrington
Technical Director	(Scotland) Neil McGuinness

== Transfers ==
=== Transfers in ===
Entry date	Position	Player	From club	Notes	Ref.
December 10, 2024	MF	(United States) Jude Terry	(United States) Los Angeles FC 2	Homegrown signing	
December 23, 2024	FW	(United States) Jeremy Ebobisse	Unattached (Note: Signed previously with the San Jose Earthquakes.)	Free agent	
January 21, 2025	MF	(Brazil) Igor Jesus	(Portugal) Estrela da Amadora	Transfer	
January 22, 2025	MF	(United States) Mark Delgado	(United States) LA Galaxy	Trade	
January 23, 2025	DF	(United States) Nkosi Tafari	(United States) FC Dallas	Trade	
January 24, 2025	MF	(Ghana) Yaw Yeboah	(United States) Columbus Crew	Free transfer (Note: Right of first refusal acquired from San Diego FC following their selection of Yeboah in the 2024 MLS Re-Entry Draft.)	
February 14, 2025	DF	(Ukraine) Artem Smolyakov	(Ukraine) Polissya Zhytomyr	Transfer	
March 1, 2025	MF	(United States) Adam Saldana	(United States) Los Angeles FC 2	First-team signing	
March 11, 2025	DF	(United States) Kenny Nielsen	(United States) Los Angeles FC 2	First-team signing	
April 24, 2025	MF	(Canada) Ryan Raposo	Unattached (Note: Signed previously with the Vancouver Whitecaps)	Free agent	
August 4, 2025	DF	(Scotland) Ryan Porteous	(England) Watford	Transfer	
August 6, 2025	FW	(South Korea) Son Heung-min	(England) Tottenham Hotspur	Transfer	
August 26, 2025	FW	(Romania) Alexandru Băluță	Unattached (Note: Signed previously with FCSB)	Free agent	
September 2, 2025	MF	(Brazil) Jailson	Unattached (Note: Signed previously with Celta Vigo)	Free agent	

=== Transfers out ===
Exit date	Position	Player	To club	Notes	Ref.
November 27, 2024	FW	(Mexico) Carlos Vela		Declined contract options	
November 27, 2024	FW	(Sierra Leone) Kei Kamara	(United States) FC Cincinnati	Declined contract options	
November 27, 2024	FW	(Germany) Luis Müller		Declined contract options	
November 27, 2024	MF	(United States) Tommy Musto		Declined contract options	
November 27, 2024	DF	(United States) Diego Rosales	(Mexico) Guadalajara	Declined contract options	
November 27, 2024	DF	(Colombia) Jesús Murillo	(Mexico) Juárez	End of contract	
November 27, 2024	MF	(Spain) Ilie Sánchez	(United States) Austin FC	End of contract	
November 27, 2024	MF	(United States) Erik Dueñas	(United States) Houston Dynamo	End of contract	
November 27, 2024	FW	(United States) Bajung Darboe	(Germany) Bayern Munich	Transfer	
December 9, 2024	FW	(Colombia) Tomás Ángel	(United States) San Diego FC	Trade	
December 31, 2024	MF	(England) Lewis O'Brien	(England) Nottingham Forest	End of Loan	
December 31, 2024	MF	(Colombia) Eduard Atuesta	(Brazil) Palmeiras	End of loan	
January 5, 2025	DF	(Mexico) Omar Campos	(Mexico) Cruz Azul	Transfer	
January 25, 2025	MF	(Poland) Mateusz Bogusz	(Mexico) Cruz Azul	Transfer	
February 14, 2025	FW	(Uruguay) Cristian Olivera	(Brazil) Grêmio	Transfer	
June 27, 2025	FW	(France) Olivier Giroud	(France) Lille	Mutual consent	
June 30, 2025	FW	(Turkey) Cengiz Ünder	(Turkey) Fenerbahçe	End of loan	
July 3, 2025	DF	(Brazil) Marlon		End of contract	
July 26, 2025	FW	(Netherlands) Javairô Dilrosun	(Mexico) América	End of loan	
August 27, 2025	DF	(Luxembourg) Maxime Chanot	N/A	Retired	

=== Loans in ===
Date from	Pos.	Player	From	Details	End date	Ref.
January 13, 2025	MF	(Norway) Odin Thiago Holm	(Scotland) Celtic	Year-long loan	December 31, 2025	
February 20, 2025	FW	(Turkey) Cengiz Ünder	(Turkey) Fenerbahçe	Short-term loan with purchase option	June 30, 2025	
April 23, 2025	MF	(United States) Frankie Amaya	(Mexico) Toluca	Season long loan	December 31, 2025	
June 11, 2023	FW	(Netherlands) Javairô Dilrosun	(Mexico) América	Short-term loan with purchase option	July 24, 2025	
July 28, 2025	MF	(Canada) Mathieu Choinière	(Switzerland) Grasshopper	Short-term loan with purchase option	December 31, 2025	
August 21, 2025	MF	(Republic of Ireland) Andrew Moran	(England) Brighton & Hove Albion	Short-term loan	December 31, 2025	

=== Out on loan ===
No.	Player	To Club	Start date	End date	Notes	Ref.
—	(Spain) Mario González	(Poland) Lech Poznań	February 11, 2025	June 30, 2025	Short-term loan	
42	(United States) Luca Bombino	(United States) San Diego FC	February 25, 2025	December 31, 2025	Year-long loan	

=== Draft picks ===
Round	#	Position	Player	College/Club Team	Reference	Status
1	22	FW	(United States) Alec Hughes	University of Massachusetts		Signed with Los Angeles FC 2

== Non-competitive matches ==
Win Draw Loss

All matches are listed with their kickoff in Pacific Time.

=== Preseason ===
January 20 1	Los Angeles FC	v	Cavalry FC	Los Angeles, California
		Report		Stadium: LAFC Performance Center; Attendance: 0 (Behind closed doors)
Note: Score has not been made public.

January 25 2	Los Angeles FC	1–1	San Jose Earthquakes	Los Angeles, California
		Report		Stadium: BMO Stadium; Attendance: 0 (Behind closed doors)

January 29 3	Los Angeles FC	1–0	Portland Timbers	Los Angeles, California
	Hollingshead	Report		Stadium: BMO Stadium; Attendance: 0 (Behind closed doors)

February 2 4	Los Angeles FC	4–0	Phoenix Rising	Indio, California
	Giroud; Bouanga; Martínez; Wibowo			Stadium: Empire Polo Club

February 5 5	Los Angeles FC	1–0	Chicago Fire	Indio, California
1:30 PM	Bouanga 65' (pen.)			Stadium: Empire Polo Club

February 11 6	Los Angeles FC	2–1	Club América	Los Angeles, California
7:30 PM	Segura (yellow card) 25'; Bouanga 46'; Ordaz 60'; Palencia (yellow card) 90'	Report	Borja (yellow card) 40'; Sánchez 63'; Araujo (yellow card) 86'	Stadium: BMO Stadium; Referee: Geoff Cameron

== Competitions ==
=== Overview ===
Competition	First match	Last match	Starting round	Final position	Record							
Competition	First match	Last match	Starting round	Final position	Pld	W	D	L	GF	GA	GD	Win %
Major League Soccer	February 22, 2025	October 18, 2025	Matchday 1	6th (3rd Conf)	34	17	9	8	65	40	+25	50.00
MLS Cup Playoffs	October 29, 2025	November 22, 2025	Round one	Conference semifinals	3	2	0	1	8	4	+4	66.67
Leagues Cup	July 29, 2025	August 5, 2025	League phase	League phase	3	1	2	0	4	3	+1	33.33
CONCACAF Champions Cup	February 18, 2025	April 9, 2025	Round One	Quarterfinals	6	3	0	3	8	7	+1	50.00
FIFA Club World Cup	June 16, 2025	June 24, 2025	Group stage	Group stage	3	0	1	2	1	4	−3	0.00
FIFA Club World Cup play-in	May 31, 2025	--	Play-in match	--	1	1	0	0	2	1	+1	100.00
Total					50	24	12	14	88	59	+29	48.00

Last updated: October 20th
Source: Competitions

=== MLS ===
==== Standings ====
===== Western Conference =====
MLS Western Conference table (2025)
Pos	Team	Pld	W	L	T	GF	GA	GD	Pts	Qualification
1	San Diego FC	34	19	9	6	64	41	+23	63	Qualification for round one and the CONCACAF Champions Cup round one
2	Vancouver Whitecaps FC (C)	34	18	7	9	66	38	+28	63	Qualification for round one
3	Los Angeles FC	34	17	8	9	65	40	+25	60	Qualification for round one
4	Minnesota United FC	34	16	8	10	56	39	+17	58	Qualification for round one
5	Seattle Sounders FC	34	15	9	10	58	48	+10	55	Qualification for round one

Source: MLS
Rules for classification: 1) points; 2) total wins; 3) total goal differential; 4) total goals scored; 5) fewer disciplinary points; 6) away goal differential; 7) away goals scored; 8) home goals differential; 9) home goals scored; 10) coin toss (2 clubs tied) or drawing of lots (≥3 clubs tied)
(C) Conference champion

===== Overall =====
Overall MLS standings table (2025)
Pos	Team	Pld	W	L	T	GF	GA	GD	Pts	Qualification
4	San Diego FC	34	19	9	6	64	41	+23	63	Qualification for the CONCACAF Champions Cup Round one (Note: As Western Conference regular season winners)
5	Vancouver Whitecaps FC (V)	34	18	7	9	66	38	+28	63	Qualification for the CONCACAF Champions Cup Round one (Note: As second highest-ranked club in 2025 MLS Supporters' Shield not already qualified)
6	Los Angeles FC	34	17	8	9	65	40	+25	60	Qualification for the CONCACAF Champions Cup Round one (Note: As third highest-ranked club in 2025 MLS Supporters' Shield not already qualified)
7	Charlotte FC	34	19	13	2	55	46	+9	59	
8	Minnesota United FC	34	16	8	10	56	39	+17	58	

Source: MLS
Rules for classification: 1) points; 2) total wins; 3) total goal differential; 4) total goals scored; 5) fewer disciplinary points; 6) away goal differential; 7) away goals scored; 8) home goals differential; 9) home goals scored; 10) coin toss (2 clubs tied) or drawing of lots (≥3 clubs tied)
(V) Canadian Championship winners

===== Results summary =====
Overall								Home						Away					
Pld	Pts	W	L	T	GF	GA	GD	W	L	T	GF	GA	GD	W	L	T	GF	GA	GD
34	60	17	8	9	65	40	+25	11	4	2	31	13	+18	6	4	7	34	27	+7

Last updated: Complete
Source: MLS Results
Pld = Matches played; Pts = Points; W = Matches won; T = Matches tied; L = Matches lost; GF = Goals for; GA = Goals against; GD = Goal difference

===== Results by round =====
Round	1	2	3	4	5	6	7	8	9	10	11	12	13	14	15	16	17	18	19	20	21	22	23	24	25	26	27	28	29	30	31	32	33	34
Stadium	H	H	A	H	A	A	A	H	A	H	H	A	H	A	A	H	H	H	H	A	H	H	A	A	A	H	A	A	H	A	H	H	A	A
Result	W	W	L	L	W	L	L	W	D	D	W	D	W	D	D	W	L	W	W	W	D	L	D	W	D	L	W	W	W	W	W	W	L	D
Points	3	6	6	6	9	9	9	12	13	14	17	18	21	22	23	26	26	29	32	35	36	36	37	40	41	41	44	47	50	53	56	59	59	60
Position (West)	5	3	5	8	3	8	9	7	7	8	5	6	5	5	6	5	7	6	6	4	5	6	5	5	5	5	5	4	4	4	4	3	3	3

Source: Match reports
A = Away; H = Home; N = Neutral; W = Win; D = Draw; L = Loss; = Conference leader; = Playoffs berth; = Wild card berth

===== Matches =====
All matches are in Pacific time

February 22 1	Los Angeles FC	1–0	Minnesota United FC	Los Angeles
1:45 pm PST	Ebobisse 78'	Report	Boxall (yellow card) 39'; Dotson (yellow card) 74'	Stadium: BMO Stadium; Attendance: 22,130; Referee: Guido Gonzales Jr.

March 1 2	Los Angeles FC	1–0	New York City FC	Los Angeles
7:30 pm PST	Ordaz (yellow card) 57'; Hollingshead 86'	Report	Parks (yellow card) 42'; Bakrar (yellow card) 45+1'	Stadium: BMO Stadium; Attendance: 22,021; Referee: Chris Penso

March 8 3	Seattle Sounders FC	5–2	Los Angeles FC	Seattle, Washington
1:30 pm PST	Kossa-Rienzi 11'; Rothrock 57'; Morris 77'; C. Roldan 84'; Rusnák 90+4'	Report	Ordaz 38'; Tafari (yellow card) 69'; Martínez 90+2'	Stadium: Lumen Field; Attendance: 30,107; Referee: Drew Fischer

March 15 4	Los Angeles FC	0–1	Austin FC	Los Angeles
12:30 pm PDT	Tillman (yellow card) 79'	Report	Biro 12'; Vázquez (yellow card) 45+1'; Sabovic (yellow card) 64'; Hines-Ike (yellow card) 79'; Stuver (yellow card) 79'; Obrian (yellow card) 90+4'; Gallagher (yellow card) 90+4'	Stadium: BMO Stadium; Attendance: 22,111; Referee: Rubiel Vazquez

March 22 5	Sporting Kansas City	0–2	Los Angeles FC	Kansas City, Kansas
5:30 pm PDT	Ndenbe (yellow card) 11'; Rodríguez (yellow card) 24'; Radoja (yellow card) 65'	Report	Martínez 18'; Long 54'; Palencia (yellow card) 60'; Yeboah (yellow card) 90+2'	Stadium: Children's Mercy Park; Attendance: 15,263; Referee: Ismir Pekmic

March 29 6	San Diego FC	3–2	Los Angeles FC	San Diego, California
7:30 pm PDT	Negri (yellow card) 14'; McVey 21'; Tverskov (yellow card) 24'; Valakari 34'; Mighten 40'; Kumado (yellow card) 88'; Lozano (yellow card) 90+6'	Report	Martínez (yellow card) 19'; Jesus (yellow card) 20' (yellow-red card) 53'; Smolyakov 43'; Ünder 45+5'; Segura (yellow card) 90+4'	Stadium: Snapdragon Stadium; Attendance: 32,502; Referee: Tori Penso

April 5 7	Houston Dynamo FC	1–0	Los Angeles FC	Houston, Texas
5:30 pm PDT	Ponce (yellow card) 16'; McGlynn (yellow card) 24', (goal) 58'; Kowalczyk (yellow card) 75'	Report	Martínez (yellow card) 30'; Saldaña (yellow card) 61'; Segura (yellow card) 74'	Stadium: Shell Energy Stadium; Attendance: 16,415; Referee: Filip Dujic

April 12 8	Los Angeles FC	2–1	San Jose Earthquakes	Los Angeles
7:30 pm PDT	Palencia 65'; Bouanga 86'	Report	Wilson (yellow card) 42'; Espinoza 90+5'	Stadium: BMO Stadium; Attendance: 22,110; Referee: Drew Fischer

April 19 9	Portland Timbers	3−3	Los Angeles FC	Portland, Oregon
7:00 pm PDT	Mora 8' (pen.), 66'; Fory (yellow card) 18'; Ayala (yellow card) 35'; Moreno 42'; Rodríguez (yellow card) 63'; Da Costa (yellow card) 76'	Report	Giroud 45'; Delgado (yellow card) 45+3'; Bouanga (yellow card) 45+3', (goal) 90' (pen.); Martínez 64'; Hollingshead (yellow card) 78'; Palencia (yellow card) 90+4'	Stadium: Providence Park; Attendance: 24,538; Referee: Guido Gonzales Jr.

April 27 10	Los Angeles FC	2–2	St. Louis City SC	Los Angeles
4:00 pm PDT	Bouanga 70', 90+9'; Tillman (yellow card) 78'	Report	Morales (yellow card) 48' (yellow-red card) 83'; Teuchert 51'; Ordaz 89' (o.g.)	Stadium: BMO Stadium; Attendance: 22,212; Referee: Jair Maruffo

May 3 11	Los Angeles FC	2–0	Houston Dynamo FC	Los Angeles
7:30 pm PDT	Ordaz 10'; Martínez (yellow card) 31'; Jesus (yellow card) 56'; Ebobisse 79'	Report	Dorsey (yellow card) 8'; Escobar (yellow card) 25' (yellow-red card) 90+5'	Stadium: BMO Stadium; Attendance: 22,127; Referee: Rosendo Mendoza

May 11 12	Vancouver Whitecaps FC	2–2	Los Angeles FC	Vancouver, British Columbia
4:00 pm PDT	White 26', 70'; Nelson (yellow card) 57'; Cubas (yellow card) 66'	Report	Delgado 8'; Bouanga 19' (pen.); Palencia (yellow card) 28'; Martínez (yellow card) 45+1'; Hollingshead (yellow card) 61'	Stadium: BC Place; Attendance: 22,437; Referee: Joe Dickerson

May 14 13	Los Angeles FC	4–0	Seattle Sounders FC	Los Angeles
7:30 pm PDT	Tillman (yellow card) 12'; Ünder 26'; Smolyakov (yellow card) 45+3'; Ebobisse 51'; Bouanga 80'; Yeboah 86'	Report	Nouhou (yellow card) 34'; De Rosario (yellow card) 56'; João Paulo (yellow card) 84'	Stadium: BMO Stadium; Attendance: 22,120; Referee: Pierre-Luc Lauziere

May 18 14	LA Galaxy	2–2	Los Angeles FC	Carson, California
6:00 pm PDT	Reus 6', 87'; Yamane (yellow card) 45+2'; Cerrillo (yellow card) 77'	Report	Bouanga 13', (yellow card) 73'; Delgado (yellow card) 25'; Palencia (yellow card) 48'; Ordaz 50'	Stadium: Dignity Health Sports Park; Attendance: 23,083; Referee: Drew Fischer

May 24 15	CF Montréal	2–2	Los Angeles FC	Montreal, Quebec
4:30 pm PDT	Vrioni 5'; Owusu 22' (pen.); Saliba (yellow card) 25'; Piette (yellow card) 69'	Report	Delgado 38', (yellow card) 83'; Giroud 77'	Stadium: Saputo Stadium; Attendance: 15,133; Referee: Rubiel Vazquez

June 8 16	Los Angeles FC	3–1	Sporting Kansas City	Los Angeles
6:00 pm PDT	Hollingshead (yellow card) 27'; Segura 45+1'; Bouanga 59' (pen.); Amaya (yellow card) 88'; Giroud 90+3'	Report	Joveljić 39'; Davis (yellow card) 67'	Stadium: BMO Stadium; Attendance: 17,031; Referee: Ricardo Montero
Note: Match moved from May 28 due to Los Angeles FC's participation in the 2025 FIFA Club World Cup playoff match.

June 29 20	Los Angeles FC	0–1	Vancouver Whitecaps FC	Los Angeles
6:30 pm PDT	Giroud (yellow card) 57'	Report	Sabbi 20'; Johnson (yellow card) 25'; Priso (yellow card) 57'	Stadium: BMO Stadium; Attendance: 22,116; Referee: Jon Freeman
Note: Match moved from June 28 due to Los Angeles FC's participation in the 2025 FIFA Club World Cup.

July 9 17	Los Angeles FC	3–0	Colorado Rapids	Los Angeles
7:30 pm PDT	Bouanga 42' (pen.); Ordaz 48'; Dilrosun 59'	Report	Travis (red card) 6'	Stadium: BMO Stadium; Attendance: 22,230; Referee: Jair Marrufo
Note: Match moved from May 31 due to Los Angeles FC's participation in the 2025 FIFA Club World Cup playoff match.

July 12 22	Los Angeles FC	2–0	FC Dallas	Los Angeles
7:30 pm PDT	Ordaz 31'; Bouanga 45' (pen.)	Report	Musa (yellow card) 67'; Acosta (yellow card) 81'	Stadium: BMO Stadium; Attendance: 22,117; Referee: Allen Chapman

July 16 23	Minnesota United FC	0–1	Los Angeles FC	Saint Paul, Minnesota
5:30 pm PDT	Yeboah (yellow card) 6'; Lod (yellow card) 25'; Romero (yellow card) 42'; Oluwaseyi (yellow card) 78'	Report	Bouanga 42' (pen.); Tillman (yellow card) 46'; Hollingshead (yellow card) 55'; Segura (yellow card) 90+3'	Stadium: Allianz Field; Attendance: 19,774; Referee: Pierre-Luc Lauziere

July 19 24	Los Angeles FC	3−3	LA Galaxy	Los Angeles
7:30 pm PDT	Bouanga 26', 63'; Dilrosun 31'; Palencia (yellow card) 39'; Segura (red card) 90+1'; Lloris (yellow card) 90+6'	Report	Pec 36' (pen.), 79', (yellow card) 90+3'; Sanabria (yellow card) 45+1'; Cuevas (yellow card) 90+1'; Fagúndez (yellow card) 90+1'; Yoshida 90+7'	Stadium: BMO Stadium; Attendance: 22,301; Referee: Guido Gonzales Jr.

July 25 25	Los Angeles FC	0–1	Portland Timbers	Los Angeles
7:30 pm PDT	Tafari (yellow card) 70'	Report	Paredes 45', (yellow card) 65'	Stadium: BMO Stadium; Attendance: 22,103; Referee: Armando Villarreal

August 9 26	Chicago Fire FC	2–2	Los Angeles FC	Bridgeview, Illinois
5:30 pm PDT	Terán 11', (yellow card) 80'; Gutiérrez (yellow card) 24'; Zinckernagel (yellow card) 62'; Bamba 70'; Brady (yellow card) 80'	Report	Hollingshead 19'; Tafari (yellow card) 64'; Segura (yellow card) 72'; Bouanga 81' (pen.)	Stadium: SeatGeek Stadium; Attendance: 19,831; Referee: Ricardo Montero

August 16 27	New England Revolution	0–2	Los Angeles FC	Foxborough, Massachusetts
4:30 pm PDT	Fofana (yellow card) 88'		Delgado 51'; Jesus (yellow card) 86'; Choinière 90+4'	Stadium: Gillette Stadium; Attendance: 27,043; Referee: Marcos de Oliveira

August 23 28	FC Dallas	1–1	Los Angeles FC	Frisco, Texas
5:30 pm PDT	Farrington 13'; Ibeagha (yellow card) 39'; Ramiro (yellow card) 63'	Report	Son 6'; Tafari (yellow card) 67'; Hollingshead (yellow card) 75'; Bouanga (yellow card) 90+8'	Stadium: Toyota Stadium; Attendance: 11,151; Referee: Ricardo Fierro

August 31 29	Los Angeles FC	1–2	San Diego FC	Los Angeles
7:45 pm PDT	Bouanga 15'	Report	Lozano 33'; Dreyer 66', (yellow card) 69'	Stadium: BMO Stadium; Attendance: 22,937; Referee: Filip Dujic

September 13 30	San Jose Earthquakes	2–4	Los Angeles FC	Santa Clara, California
5:30 pm PDT	Judd 18'; Arango (yellow card) 21'; Vieira (yellow card) 57'; Palencia 90' (o.g.)	Report	Son 1'; Bouanga 9' 12' 87'; Porteous (yellow card) 67'	Stadium: Levi's Stadium; Attendance: 50,978; Referee: Rubiel Vazquez

September 17 19	Real Salt Lake	1–4	Los Angeles FC	Sandy, Utah
6:30 pm PDT	Cruz (yellow card) 37'; Katranis (yellow card) 62'; Gozo 76'; Olatunji (red card); Wolff (yellow card) 90+6'	Report	Son 3', 16', 82'; Moran (yellow card) 74'; Bouanga 88'	Stadium: America First Field; Attendance: 19,778; Referee: Armando Villarreal
Note: Match moved from June 25 due to Los Angeles FC's participation in the 2025 FIFA Club World Cup.

September 21 31	Los Angeles FC	4–1	Real Salt Lake	Los Angeles
6:00 pm PDT	Tillman (yellow card) 20'; Bouanga 45+1', 73', 87'; Son 45+3'	Report	Vera 14'; Yedlin (yellow card) 16'	Stadium: BMO Stadium; Attendance: 22,901; Referee: Alexis Da Silva

September 27 32	St. Louis City SC	0–3	Los Angeles FC	St. Louis, Missouri
5:30 pm PDT	Jeong Sang-bin (yellow card) 3'; Pompeu (yellow card) 66'; Löwen (yellow card) 73'; Baumgartl (yellow card) 90'; Klauss (yellow card) 90+10'	Report	Bouanga 15'; Son 45+4', 60'; Segura (yellow card) 51'	Stadium: Energizer Park; Attendance: 22,423; Referee: Victor Rivas

October 5 33	Los Angeles FC	1–0	Atlanta United FC	Los Angeles
6:00 pm PDT	Segura (yellow card) 18'; Choinière (yellow card) 64'; Bouanga 86'	Report	Slisz (yellow card) 90+3'	Stadium: BMO Stadium; Attendance: 22,067; Referee: Allen Chapman

October 8 18	Los Angeles FC	2–0	Toronto FC	Los Angeles
7:30 pm PDT	Ebobisse 13'; Delgado (yellow card) 17'; Amaya 69'	Report	Thompson (yellow card) 58'; Coello (red card) 90+9'	Stadium: BMO Stadium; Attendance: 22,020; Referee: Filip Dujic
Note: Match moved from June 13 due to Los Angeles FC's participation in the 2025 FIFA Club World Cup.

October 12 21	Austin FC	1–0	Los Angeles FC	Austin, Texas
3:00 pm PDT	Sánchez (yellow card) 17'; Pereira (yellow card) 75'; Đorđević (yellow card) 77'; Wolff 83'	Report	Segura (yellow card) 10'; Tillman (yellow card) 54'	Stadium: Q2 Stadium; Attendance: 20,738; Referee: Rosendo Mendoza
Note: Match moved from July 5 due to the July 2025 Central Texas floods.

October 18 34	Colorado Rapids	2–2	Los Angeles FC	Commerce City, Colorado
6:00 pm PDT	Cannon (yellow card) 17'; Aaronson (yellow card) 45+2', (goal) 62'; Ku-Dipietro (yellow card) 54'; Yapi 87'	Report	Porteous (yellow card) 15'; Segura (yellow card) 26'; Son 42'; Tafari (yellow card) 64'; Moran 90'	Stadium: Dick's Sporting Goods Park; Attendance: 18,258; Referee: Rubiel Vazquez

=== MLS Cup playoffs ===
==== Round One ====
October 29 Round One	Los Angeles FC	2–1	Austin FC	Los Angeles
7:30 PM PDT	Hines-Ike 20' (o.g.); Ordaz 79'; Palencia (yellow card) 90+3'	Report	Svatok (yellow card) 49'; Sánchez (yellow card) 51'; Gallagher 63'	Stadium: BMO Stadium; Attendance: 22,142; Referee: Rosendo Mendoza

November 2 Round One	Austin FC	1–4	Los Angeles FC	Austin, Texas
5:30 PM PST	Hines-Ike (yellow card) 34'; Pereira 45+6' (pen.); Sánchez (yellow card) 63'; Kolmanič (yellow card) 77'; Wolff (yellow card) 81'	Report	Son 21'; Bouanga 25', 44'; Porteous (yellow card) 45+5'; Tillman (yellow card) 53'; Moran (yellow card) 71'; Segura (yellow card) 81'; Ebobisse 90+3'	Stadium: Q2 Stadium; Attendance: 20,738; Referee: Joe Dickerson
Note: Los Angeles FC won the series 2–0.

==== Conference Semifinals ====
November 22 Conference Semifinals	Vancouver Whitecaps FC	2–2 (4–3 p)	Los Angeles FC	Vancouver, British Columbia
6:30 PM PST	Sabbi 39'; Müller (yellow card) 44'; Laborda 45+1'; Blackmon (yellow card) 64' (yellow-red card) 90+2'; Berhalter (yellow card) 87'; Priso (yellow card) 97'; Takaoka (yellow card) 102'	Report	Delgado (yellow card) 52'; Son 60', 90+5'; Porteous (yellow card) 77'; Raposo (yellow card) 81'; Amaya (yellow card) 95'	Stadium: BC Place; Attendance: 53,957; Referee: Rubiel Vazquez
	Penalties
	Berhalter (penalty scored); Nelson (penalty scored); Gauld (penalty scored); Ocampo (penalty missed); Laborda (penalty scored)		(penalty missed) Son; (penalty scored) Bouanga; (penalty missed) Delgado; (penalty scored) Moran; (penalty scored) Amaya

=== CONCACAF Champions Cup ===
==== Round One ====
February 18 First leg	Colorado Rapids (United States)	2–1	(United States) Los Angeles FC	Commerce City, Colorado
7:00 PM PST	Awaziem (yellow card) 40'; Mihailovic 48' (pen.), 80'	Report	Long 87'	Stadium: Dick's Sporting Goods Park; Attendance: 1,811; Referee: Reon Radix (Grenada)

February 25 Second leg	Los Angeles FC (United States)	1–0	(United States) Colorado Rapids	Los Angeles
7:00 PM PST	Delgado 49'; Tillman (yellow card) 56'	Report	Atencio (yellow card) 43'; Larraz (yellow card) 60'; Bassett (yellow card) 61'; Cannon (yellow card) 66'; Rosenberry (yellow card) 72'	Stadium: BMO Stadium; Attendance: 17,203; Referee: Pierre-Luc Lauziere (Canada)
Note: 2–2 on aggregate. Los Angeles FC won on away goals.

==== Round of 16 ====
March 4 First leg	Los Angeles FC (United States)	3–0	(United States) Columbus Crew	Los Angeles
7:30 PM PST	Bouanga 20', 46'; Jesus (yellow card) 21'; Ordaz 81'	Report	Herrera (yellow card) 90'	Stadium: BMO Stadium; Attendance: 7,285; Referee: César Arturo Ramos

March 11 Second leg	Columbus Crew (United States)	2–1 (2–4 agg.)	(United States) Los Angeles FC	Columbus, Ohio
5:30 PM PDT	Russell-Rowe 10'; Rossi 45' (pen.)	Report	Bouanga (yellow card) 45', (goal) 90+6'; Delgado (yellow card) 90+3'; Giroud (yellow card) 90+3'	Stadium: Lower.com Field; Attendance: 6,205; Referee: Iván Barton (El Salvador)
Note: Los Angeles FC advance 4–2

==== Quarterfinals ====
April 2 First leg	Los Angeles FC (United States)	1–0	(United States) Inter Miami CF	Los Angeles
8:30 PM PDT	Ordaz (yellow card) 26', (goal) 57'	Report	Segovia (yellow card) 66'; Busquets (yellow card) 71'	Stadium: BMO Stadium; Attendance: 22,207; Referee: Oshane Nation

April 9 Second leg	Inter Miami CF (United States)	3–1 (3–2 agg.)	(United States) Los Angeles FC	Fort Lauderdale, Florida
5:00 PM PDT	Messi 35', 84' (pen.); Bright (yellow card) 53'; Allen 61'; Falcón (yellow card) 71'	Report	Long 9'; Hollingshead (yellow card) 30'; Marlon (yellow card) 89'; Segura (yellow card) 90+3'	Stadium: Chase Stadium; Attendance: 19,609; Referee: César Ramos
Note: Inter Miami CF won 3–2 on aggregate.

=== FIFA Club World Cup ===
==== Preliminary Round ====
May 31 Playoff	Los Angeles FC (United States)	2–1 (a.e.t.)	(Mexico) América	Los Angeles
7:30 PM PDT	Jesus (yellow card) 59', (goal) 89'; Delgado (yellow card) 62'; Palencia (yellow card) 66'; Amaya (yellow card) 104'; Tillman (yellow card) 110'; Bouanga 115'	Report	Cáceres (yellow card) 18'; Rodríguez 64' (pen.); Zendejas (yellow card) 89'; Reyes (yellow card) 119'	Stadium: BMO Stadium; Attendance: 20,714; Referee: Wilton Sampaio

==== Group stage (Group D) ====
Pos	Team	Pld	W	D	L	GF	GA	GD	Pts	Qualification
1	(Brazil) Flamengo	3	2	1	0	6	2	+4	7	Advance to knockout stage
2	(England) Chelsea	3	2	0	1	6	3	+3	6	Advance to knockout stage
3	(Tunisia) Espérance de Tunis	3	1	0	2	1	5	−4	3	
4	(United States) Los Angeles FC	3	0	1	2	1	4	−3	1	

Source: FIFA

June 16 Group Stage	Chelsea (England)	2–0	(United States) Los Angeles FC	Atlanta, Georgia
12:00 pm PDT	Neto 34'; James (yellow card) 36'; Adarabioyo (yellow card) 45'; Cucurella (yellow card) 75'; Fernández 79'	Report	Martínez (yellow card) 58'; Palencia (yellow card) 90+2'	Stadium: Mercedes-Benz Stadium; Attendance: 22,137; Referee: Jesús Valenzuela (Venezuela)

June 20 Group Stage	Los Angeles FC (United States)	0–1	(Tunisia) Espérance de Tunis	Nashville, Tennessee
3:00 pm PDT	Tillman (yellow card) 23'; Bouanga (penalty missed) 90+11'	Report	Belaïli (yellow card) 53', (goal) 70'; Sasse (yellow card) 64'	Stadium: Geodis Park; Attendance: 13,651; Referee: Espen Eskås (Norway)

June 24 Group Stage	Los Angeles FC (United States)	1–1	(Brazil) Flamengo	Orlando, Florida
6:00 pm PDT	Jesus (yellow card) 45+4'; Delgado (yellow card) 75'; Bouanga 84'	Report	Wallace Yan 86'	Stadium: Camping World Stadium; Attendance: 32,933; Referee: Salman Falahi (Qatar)

=== Leagues Cup ===
==== Group stage ====
July 29 Group Stage	Los Angeles FC (United States)	1–1 (10–11 p)	(Mexico) Mazatlán	Los Angeles
7:30 PM PDT	Martínez 29'; Yeboah (yellow card) 36'	Report	Gomes 35'	Stadium: BMO Stadium; Attendance: 11,409; Referee: Fernando Hernández
	Penalties
	Bouanga (penalty scored); Delgado (penalty missed); Tillman (penalty scored); Martínez (penalty scored); Segura (penalty scored); Palencia (penalty scored); Ordaz (penalty scored); Smolyakov (penalty scored); Jesus (penalty scored); Tafari (penalty scored); Ochoa (penalty scored); Bouanga (penalty missed)		Benedetti (penalty scored); Samir (penalty missed); Colula (penalty scored); Hernández (penalty scored); Torres (penalty scored); Merolla (penalty scored); Duarte (penalty scored); Fierro (penalty scored); S. Rodríguez (penalty scored); García (penalty scored); R. Rodríguez (penalty scored); Benedetti (penalty scored)

August 1 Group Stage	Los Angeles FC (United States)	1–1 (4–2 p)	(Mexico) Pachuca	Los Angeles
7:30 PM PDT	Bouanga 10'; Ordaz (red card) 29'; Martínez (yellow card) 35'; Jesus (yellow card) 54'	Report	Montiel 32'; Aceves (yellow card) 58'; Cádiz (red card) 83'	Stadium: BMO Stadium; Attendance: 14,733; Referee: Bryan Lopez
	Penalties
	Bouanga (penalty scored); Delgado (penalty scored); Palencia (penalty scored); Segura (penalty scored)		(penalty missed) López; (penalty scored) Guzmán; (penalty scored) Togni; (penalty missed) Bautista

August 5 Group Stage	UANL (Mexico)	1–2	(United States) Los Angeles FC	Los Angeles
7:30 PM PDT	Guzmán (yellow card) 35'; Lainez (yellow card) 37'; Gignac (yellow card) 45+5'; López 48'	Report	Nielsen (yellow card) 9'; Martínez 38' (pen.), 64'; Saldana (yellow card) 44'; Palencia (yellow card) 89'	Stadium: BMO Stadium; Attendance: 15,852; Referee: Said Martínez
