= Hugo Lloris =

French footballer (born 1986)

- Lloris with Los Angeles FC in 2026

Personal information
- Full name: Hugo Hadrien Dominique Lloris
- Date of birth: 26 December 1986 (age 39)
- Place of birth: Nice, France
- Height: 1.88 m (6 ft 2 in)
- Position: Goalkeeper

Team information
- Current team: Los Angeles FC
- Number: 1

Youth career
- 1993–1997: Cedac Cimiez
- 1997–2005: Nice

Senior career*
Years	Team	Apps	(Gls)
2005–2006	Nice II	20	(0)
2005–2008	Nice	72	(0)
2008–2012	Lyon	146	(0)
2012–2024	Tottenham Hotspur	361	(0)
2024–	Los Angeles FC	94	(0)

International career
2003–2004	France U18	3	(0)
2004–2005	France U19	14	(0)
2005–2006	France U20	4	(0)
2006–2008	France U21	5	(0)
2008–2022	France	145	(0)
Medal record
Men's football
Representing France
FIFA World Cup
Winner	2018 Russia
Runner-up	2022 Qatar
UEFA Nations League
Winner	2021 Italy
UEFA European Championship
Runner-up	2016 France
UEFA European Under-19 Championship
Winner	2005 Northern Ireland
- * Club domestic league appearances and goals as of 1 November 2026

Hugo Hadrien Dominique Lloris (French: [yɡo adʁijɛ̃ dominik lɔʁi], born 26 December 1986) is a French professional footballer who plays as a goalkeeper for Major League Soccer club Los Angeles FC. In addition, he is also one of a select number of players who have amassed over 1,000 career appearances.

Lloris began his career with his hometown club Nice, made his debut as a teenager in October 2005, and started as a goalkeeper during the team's run to the 2006 Coupe de la Ligue final. After excelling at the club for three seasons, he moved to Lyon. Lloris won several domestic awards in his first season with the club and, in his second campaign, earned award nominations for his performances in the UEFA Champions League, which saw Lyon reach the semi-finals for the first time. He was also named the National Union of Professional Footballers (UNFP) Ligue 1 Goalkeeper of the Year three times while at Lyon.

Lloris joined Premier League side Tottenham Hotspur in 2012 and made over 400 appearances for the club across eleven seasons, being named captain in 2015 and helping the team reach the UEFA Champions League final in 2019. He joined Los Angeles FC in Major League Soccer in 2024.

Lloris represented France at under-18, under-19, and under-21 level. He played in the team that won the 2005 UEFA European Under-19 Championship. Lloris made his senior international debut in November 2008 in a friendly against Uruguay. He helped France qualify for the 2010 FIFA World Cup and was applauded by the media for his performance over two legs against the Republic of Ireland in the qualifying play-offs. He captained the national team for the first time in 2010, and became first-choice captain on 28 February 2012, leading France into the quarter-finals of both UEFA Euro 2012 and the 2014 World Cup, as well as runners-up at Euro 2016 and the 2022 World Cup, and winning the 2018 World Cup held in Russia. He announced his retirement from international football in January 2023, having made 145 appearances and being France's most-capped player.

== Early life ==
Hugo Hadrien Dominique Lloris was born on 26 December 1986 in the Mediterranean city of Nice to an upper-class family. His French mother was a lawyer and his father is a Monte Carlo-based banker of Catalan Spanish descent. He has a younger brother, Gautier, who played for his older brother's former club Nice as a central defender. As a youth, like his international and club teammate Yoann Gourcuff, Lloris excelled at tennis and played the sport up until the age of 13. He was among the top players in his age group, ranking high in the country's national standings before opting to focus on football.

Lloris studied at the Lycée Thierry Maulnier in Nice until 2004.

== Club career ==
=== Early career ===
Lloris started playing football at the age of six at CEDAC (Centre de Diffusion et d'Action Culturelle), a local cultural center based in the neighborhood of Cimiez, Nice. The centre offered a variety of activities, which included football. Lloris played a variety of positions at the centre, such as in the attack, before switching to the goalkeeper position after coaches noticed that he possessed impressive goalkeeping qualities, such as ball-handling and catching skills. Lloris excelled at the position and caught the attention of former Nice goalkeeper and French international Dominique Baratelli, who recommended that the player join his former club. At the age of ten, Lloris joined Nice's youth academy. He spent several years in the club's youth academy and was the starting goalkeeper for the club's under-17 team that won the 2003–04 edition of the Championnat Nationaux des 18 ans, a country-wide domestic league competition for players under the age of 18.

=== Nice ===
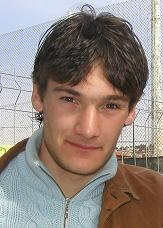
Lloris with Nice in 2005

After success with the club's under-18 team, Lloris was promoted to the club's reserve team in the Championnat de France Amateur, the fourth level of French football, for the 2004–05 season. He alternated the starting goalkeeper spot with Hilaire Munoz as he appeared in 12 matches. Lloris was promoted to the first team squad ahead of the 2005–06 season and assigned the number 1 shirt. He was designated by manager Frédéric Antonetti as the team's starting goalkeeper for the club's Coupe de la Ligue campaign ahead of fan-favourite (and fellow Nice native) Damien Gregorini, who was relied more upon in league play. Lloris made his professional debut on 25 October 2005, at the age of 18, recording a clean sheet in Nice's 2–0 Coupe de la Ligue win over Châteauroux. He recorded another clean sheet the following round against Sedan and helped Nice upset favorites Bordeaux and Derby de la Côte d'Azur rivals Monaco in the quarter-finals and semi-finals respectively, meaning the club had reached its first-ever Coupe de la Ligue final. In the final, Lloris played the entire match in the club's 2–1 defeat against Nancy.

Lloris made his league debut on 18 March 2006 against Nancy picking up a clean sheet in a 1–0 victory. He made four more league appearances that season. The following season, Lloris was given the starting job permanently ahead of Gregorini, who subsequently departed the club for Nancy. Lloris appeared in all but one league match recording 13 clean sheets as Nice finished in 16th place. Despite the disappointing finish, the club was the fifth-best defensive team in the league with Lloris conceding only 36 goals. Only veterans Grégory Coupet, Cédric Carrasso and Ulrich Ramé conceded fewer. For the early part of the 2007–08 season, Lloris endured a recurring ligament injury in his left knee, which forced him to miss three weeks in September. He returned to the team on 6 October 2007 in a league match against Le Mans, but was substituted out after 71 minutes after the injury relapsed. Lloris missed a further six weeks before returning on 24 November in the team's 2–1 victory over Paris Saint-Germain. He appeared consistently with the team for the rest of the season as Nice finished in eighth place, the club's best finish in the league since finishing sixth in the 1988–89 season. Lloris conceded only 24 goals in his 30 appearances recording 13 clean sheets. He contributed to a defense that only conceded 30 overall during the season, tied for the league-best. Lloris' efforts that season led to him being approached by several big European clubs with hopes of signing him for the future.

=== Lyon ===
==== 2008–09 season ====
After another solid season with Nice, speculation arose as to where Lloris would play the following season. He was primarily linked to French club Lyon, who wanted him to replace the departing Grégory Coupet, Milan, who wanted him to replace the Brazilian Dida, and Tottenham Hotspur, who wanted Lloris to replace Paul Robinson. After reportedly coming to personal terms with Milan, Lloris snubbed the Italian club for seven-time Ligue 1 champions Lyon. Milan vice president Adriano Galliani later declared that an agreement had been all but reached stating that Lloris was "practically ours", but the deal reached a stumbling block when Milan goalkeeper Christian Abbiati refused a move to Palermo. Lloris explained his decision citing Lyon's European ambitions, more playing time at Lyon, and in Milan, he was not guaranteed the starting goalkeeper spot. The transfer fee was initially undisclosed, but was later discovered to be priced at €8.5 million. He was promptly handed the number 1 shirt and also the starting goalkeeper position.

Lloris made his club debut in the team's opening league match of the 2008–09 season on 10 August 2008 against Toulouse. Lyon won the match 3–0 win giving the goalkeeper his first career clean sheet with the club. In the following three matches, Lloris earned clean sheets against Lorient and regional rivals Grenoble and Saint-Étienne. Despite Lyon losing out on the title for the first time in seven years, he finished the campaign conceding only 27 goals in the league and recording 16 clean sheets; both of which were second-best to only Cédric Carrasso. Lloris was, subsequently, named the league's top goalkeeper and also named to the Team of the Year.

==== 2009–10 season ====
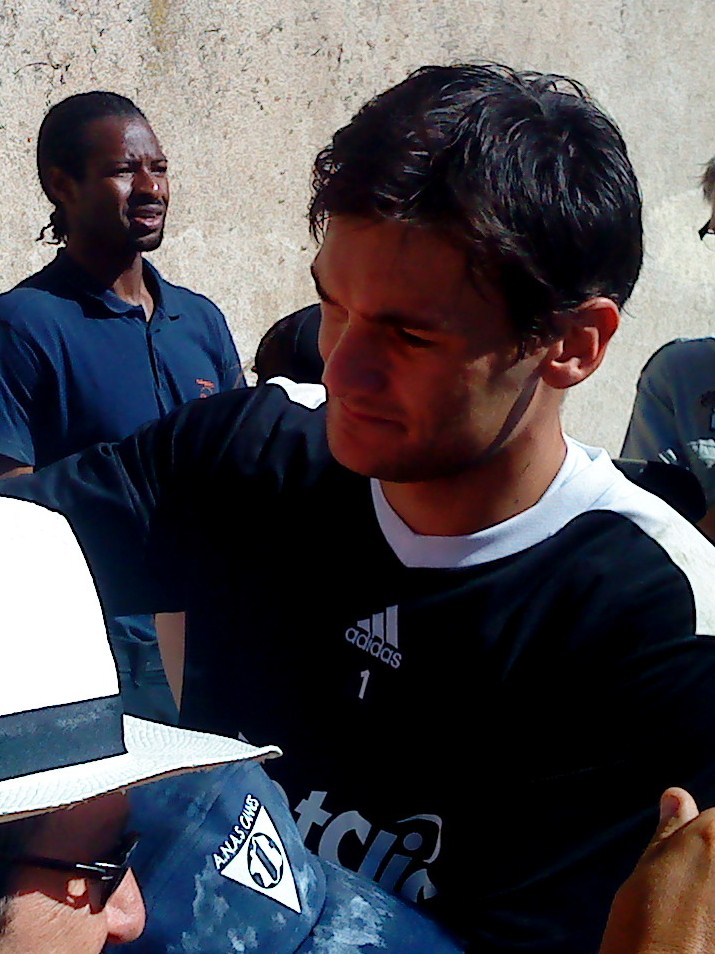
Lloris signing autographs in 2010

In the 2009–10 season, Lloris remained the club's first-choice goalkeeper and opened the new campaign by recording four clean sheets in the club's first eight matches. For his performances in the month of September, he was awarded the UNFP Player of the Month becoming the first goalkeeper since Steve Mandanda in August 2008 to receive the award. Lloris earned media praise for his performances against Liverpool in the UEFA Champions League. In the first match, played at Anfield, Lloris made four saves holding Liverpool to only one goal. Lyon won the match 2–1. In the second match at the Stade de Gerland, he produced stops from shots by Fernando Torres, Dirk Kuyt and Andriy Voronin in the first half, then displayed reflexes to deny the Brazilian Lucas midway through the second period. Though Lyon conceded late, the team drew the match 1–1 with a goal from Lisandro López in stoppage time.

On 8 November 2009, Lloris, alongside Marseille and France's number two goalkeeper Steve Mandanda, each conceded five goals in a 5–5 draw between Lyon and Marseille, though most of the goals conceded were attributed to "slack defending" displayed by both clubs as described by the media and both managers. On 20 December, Lloris finished third behind Nicolas Anelka and Yoann Gourcuff in voting for the France Football 2009 French Player of the Year award.

Lloris remained consistent during the 2010 portion of the season conceding only two goals in the club's first four matches of the year with Lyon winning all of them and Lloris picking up two clean sheets. On 16 February, Lloris earned a clean sheet in Lyon's first leg of its UEFA Champions League knockout round match against Real Madrid. Lloris made two saves in the team's 1–0 victory making a finger-tipping save from a deflected Cristiano Ronaldo shot in the 61st minute and producing a reflex save on a shot from Gonzalo Higuaín three minutes later to keep Lyon ahead on the scoreline. Lyon later achieved qualification to the quarter-finals in the competition after drawing 1–1 in Madrid with Lloris conceding the opening goal to Cristiano Ronaldo in the sixth minute. It was the goalkeeper's first goal conceded in over 620 minutes. On 2 May, Lloris provided the assist on the game-winning goal scored by Michel Bastos in Lyon's 1–0 win over Montpellier. A week later, he was named, for the second consecutive season, the UNFP Ligue 1 Goalkeeper of the Year.

==== 2010–2012 ====
Ahead of the 2010–11 season, Lloris was nominated for the UEFA Club Goalkeeper of the Year award at the UEFA Club Football Awards, but lost out on the award to Champions League-winning keeper Júlio César of Internazionale. In the season, Lloris performed well, despite conceding a career-high 40 goals in the league as Lyon failed to win the league for the third consecutive season. The frustrating season for the club and Lloris himself reached its nadir on 3 April 2011 following the club's 2–2 away draw with Lloris' former club Nice. Despite being up 2–0 heading into stoppage time, Lyon conceded two goals within two minutes of each other, an Éric Mouloungui penalty and a goal at the death from Renato Civelli, allowing Nice to leave the match with a draw. Following the conclusion of the match, a disappointed Lloris, who had previously saved a penalty shot in the match, delivered a surprising profanity-laced declaration in the team's locker room, in which he questioned the team's overall performance. Following the team's 3–0 win over Lens the following week, in which Lloris earned his first clean sheet in over a month, the goalkeeper reflected on his comments after the Nice match, stating: "It was a human reaction. There was frustration and accumulation and it had to come out. It was intolerable to draw 2–2 when leading 2–0."

In the 2011–12 Champions League, Lyon finished second in their group to qualify to the round of 16, before they were eliminated by APOEL on penalties. In the Coupe de France, Lyon managed to win the title after a 1–0 win over Quevilly in the final. Despite Lyon finishing fourth in Ligue 1, Lloris was voted best goalkeeper in the championship for the third time in his career.

=== Tottenham Hotspur ===
==== 2012–2015: First seasons in London ====
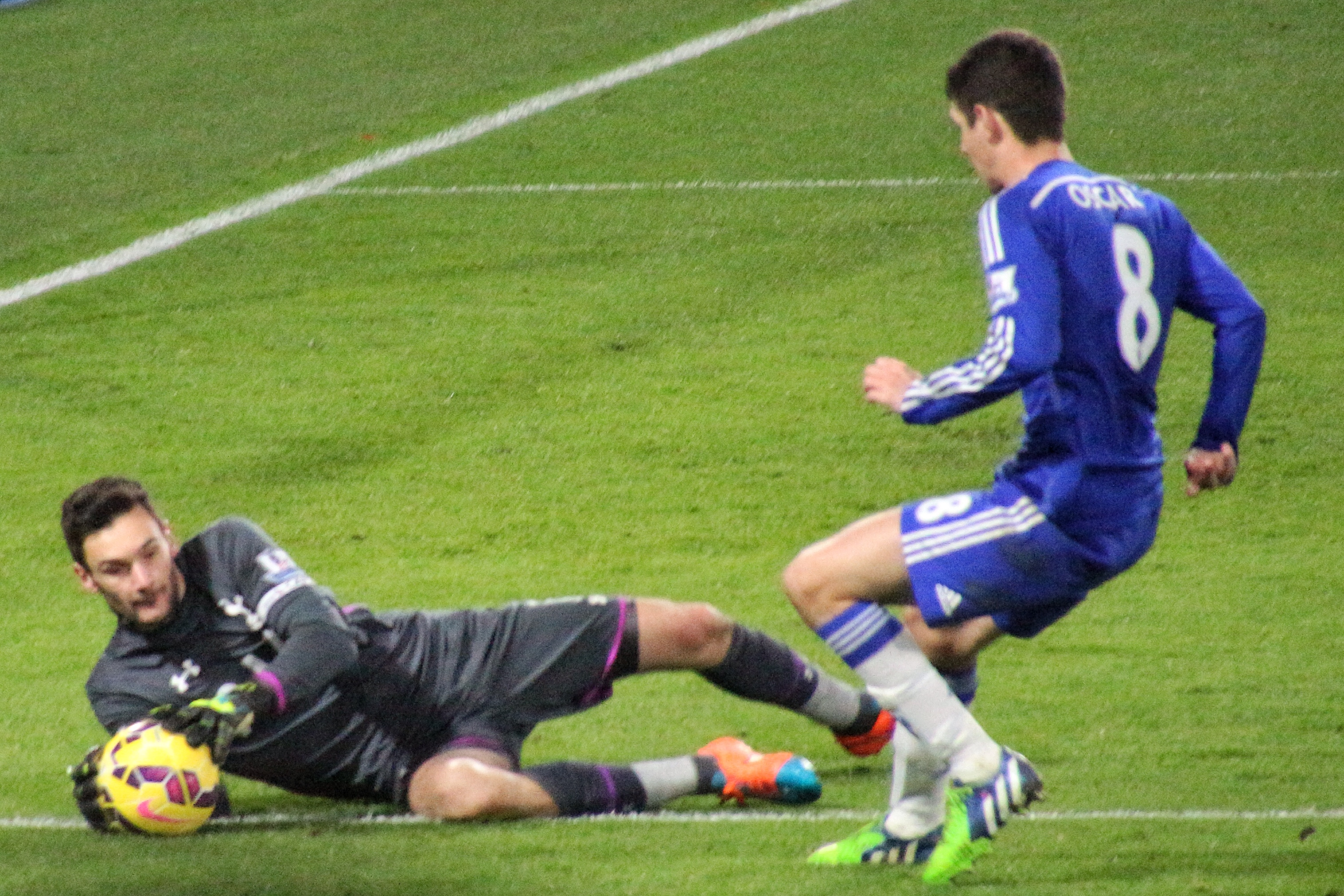
Lloris (left) making a save for Tottenham Hotspur in 2014

Lloris signed for Tottenham Hotspur on 31 August 2012 for €10 million and €5 million variable. Lyon also receives 20% of Lloris's future transfer profit. He made his debut for Spurs in a UEFA Europa League match against Lazio on 20 September 2012, the result of the match was 0–0. Lloris started his first Premier League game against Aston Villa on 7 October 2012, keeping a clean sheet in a 2–0 home victory. His appearance ended fellow Tottenham goalkeeper Brad Friedel's run of 310 consecutive games in the Premier League. After conceding only four goals in six games, he was nominated for the Premier League Player of the Month for December 2012, but lost out to Manchester United's Robin van Persie. Lloris ended the 2012–13 season with 27 appearances and 9 clean sheets.

Following speculation linking him with a move to Monaco, Lloris insisted he had left Lyon to play abroad. On 3 November 2013, in a match against Everton, Lloris lost consciousness in a collision with Romelu Lukaku's knee, but remained in the game after manager André Villas-Boas determined he "showed great character and personality". The decision was heavily criticised by head injury charities, FIFA and the players' union, FIFPro.

Lloris signed a five-year contract extension in July 2014. He said that Mauricio Pochettino, the new manager at Tottenham, had convinced him to sign the new contract with his "rigour and vision" that gave the club "new benchmarks".

In a 2014–15 UEFA Europa League group stage match on 23 October 2014, Tottenham were leading Asteras Tripoli 5–0 with four minutes to play when Lloris was sent off for a professional foul on Tasos Tsokanis. As the team had used all three substitutes, forward Harry Kane was forced into goal and conceded a goal from a freekick in the 89th minute; Tottenham won the match 5–1. Tottenham progressed through the League Cup to face Chelsea in the final at Wembley. Lloris was named in the starting eleven in the hopes of getting silverware but Tottenham lost 2–0.

==== 2016–2019: Captaincy and Champions League runner-up ====
In August 2015, Tottenham manager Mauricio Pochettino named Lloris permanent captain of the team, replacing the outgoing Younès Kaboul.

In a 2016–17 UEFA Champions League group stage match (which ended in a 0–0 draw) against Bayer Leverkusen on 18 October 2016, Lloris made a string of fine saves, including a spectacular one-handed stop on the goal-line to deny Javier Hernández; Tottenham's manager Mauricio Pochettino described Lloris's performance in the second half as "brilliant". On 22 November 2016, Lloris saved Radamel Falcao's 11th-minute penalty and pulled off multiple world-class saves, including incredibly tipping Kamil Glik's powerful volley from five metres out over the bar in the 68th minute, in their 2016–17 UEFA Champions League group stage match away at Monaco; however Tottenham lost the match 1–2 and were eliminated from the competition.

In December 2016, Lloris signed a contract extension to remain at Tottenham until 2022. In the 2016–17 season, Lloris helped Tottenham achieve the best defensive record in the club's history, conceding only 26 goals in the Premier League that season (only 9 of which were conceded in home league games), 6 better than the previous record of 32 conceded that was set in the 1908–09 season in the Second Division. He kept 15 clean sheets this season, but missed out on the Golden Glove award when a goal was conceded in the last game of the season, a record-breaking 7–1 away league win at Hull City.

On 17 April 2018, Lloris made his 250th appearance for Tottenham in a 1–1 draw with Brighton. In doing so, he became only the 61st player, and sixth goalkeeper to achieve the milestone for the club.

In the Champions League group round match against PSV on 24 October 2018, Lloris was sent off after a challenge late in the game that ended in a 2–2 draw. On 2 March 2019, Lloris saved a late penalty in the North London derby, and kept the score at 1–1. A few days later on 5 March 2019, in the Champions League last-16 away tie against Borussia Dortmund, Lloris made a number of crucial saves to kept a clean sheet, which ensured a 4–0 win on aggregate and progress to the club's second quarterfinal in the Champions League. This is his 100th clean sheet with the club. He also kept a clean sheet in the home leg of the quarter-final against Manchester City, saving a penalty in a 1–0 win that helped keep Tottenham in the competition. The previous week in the Premier League match against Liverpool, he made a goalkeeping error which let in a late goal and lost 2–1.

==== 2019–2022: 300th and 400th appearance ====
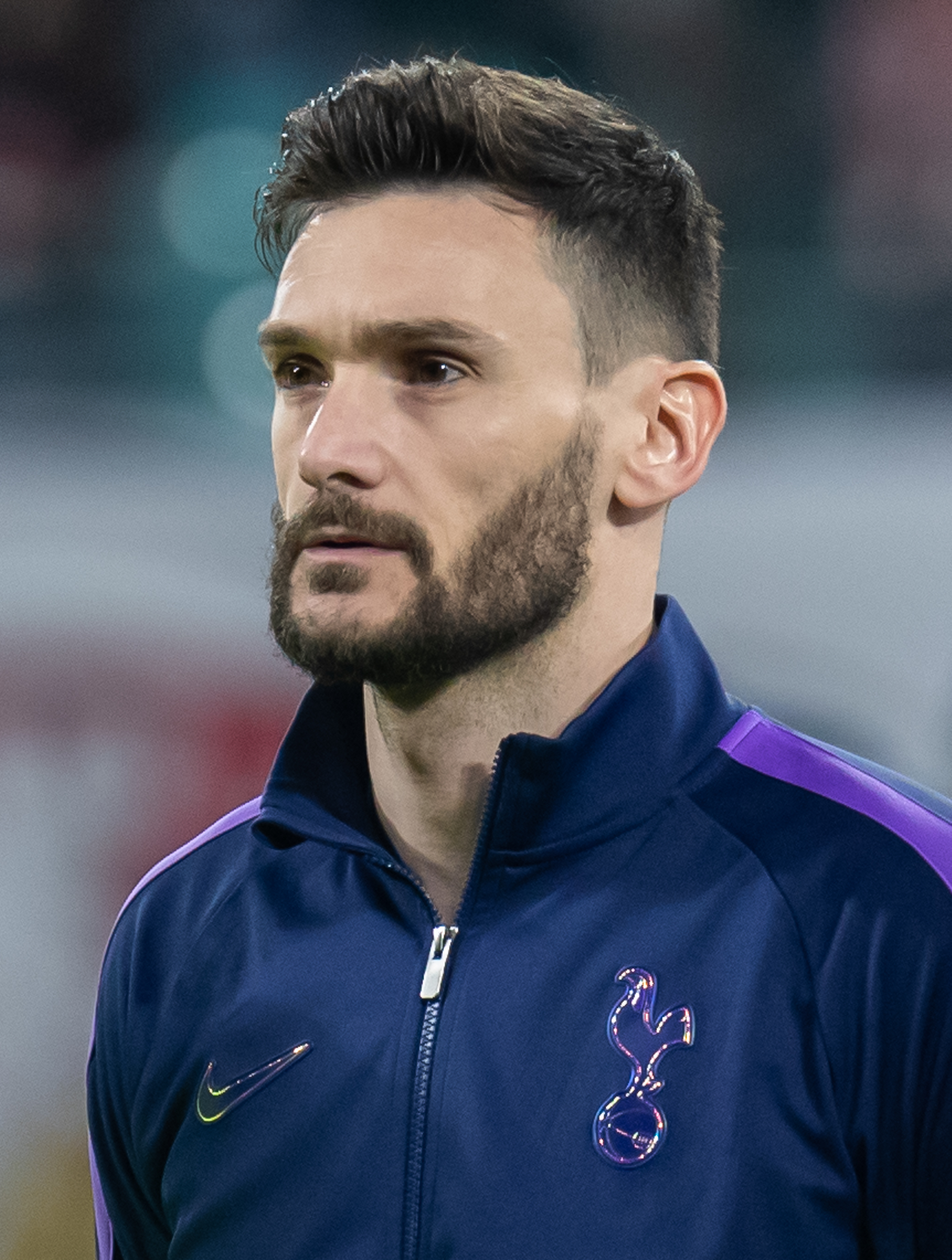
Lloris with Tottenham Hotspur in 2020

In the 2019–20 season, Lloris made his 300th appearance for the club in the second league match of the season against Manchester City, a match that finished 2–2. On 5 October, Lloris was carried off on a stretcher after suffering a dislocated elbow against Brighton, a match which ended in 3–0 defeat for Spurs. Ligament damage sustained in the injury would rule him out the team for a few months. In November 2019, he underwent surgery for the dislocation. He returned from injury in January 2020 in the home game against Norwich City.

On 29 November 2020, he played his 100th European match in a 1–0 defeat against Royal Antwerp in the Europa League, becoming the first French goalkeeper to achieve this feat. On 28 February 2021, he had his 100th Premier League clean sheet in a 4–0 win over Burnley.

On 22 August 2021, he played his 300th Premier League match in a 1–0 away win over Wolverhampton Wanderers. In January 2022, he extended his contract with Tottenham Hotspur until 2024. On 19 February 2022, he made his 400th appearance for his club in all competitions in a 3–2 away win over Manchester City. On 15 May 2022, he equaled his record of 15 clean sheets per season in a 1–0 win over Burnley, before breaking the record to reach his personal best of 16 clean sheets in a 5–0 away win over Norwich City in the last match of the season.

==== 2023: Limited playing opportunities ====
On 23 April 2023, Lloris was substituted off at half-time in a 6–1 defeat to Newcastle United. This would be his last appearance for the club. In July 2023, Tottenham announced that Lloris was left out of the club pre-season tour, with a statement reading that he could "explore prospective transfer opportunities". On 12 August, it was announced that Son Heung-min had replaced Lloris as club captain. Lloris remained at the club and continued training with the squad despite failing to be included in match-day squads by new manager Ange Postecoglou.

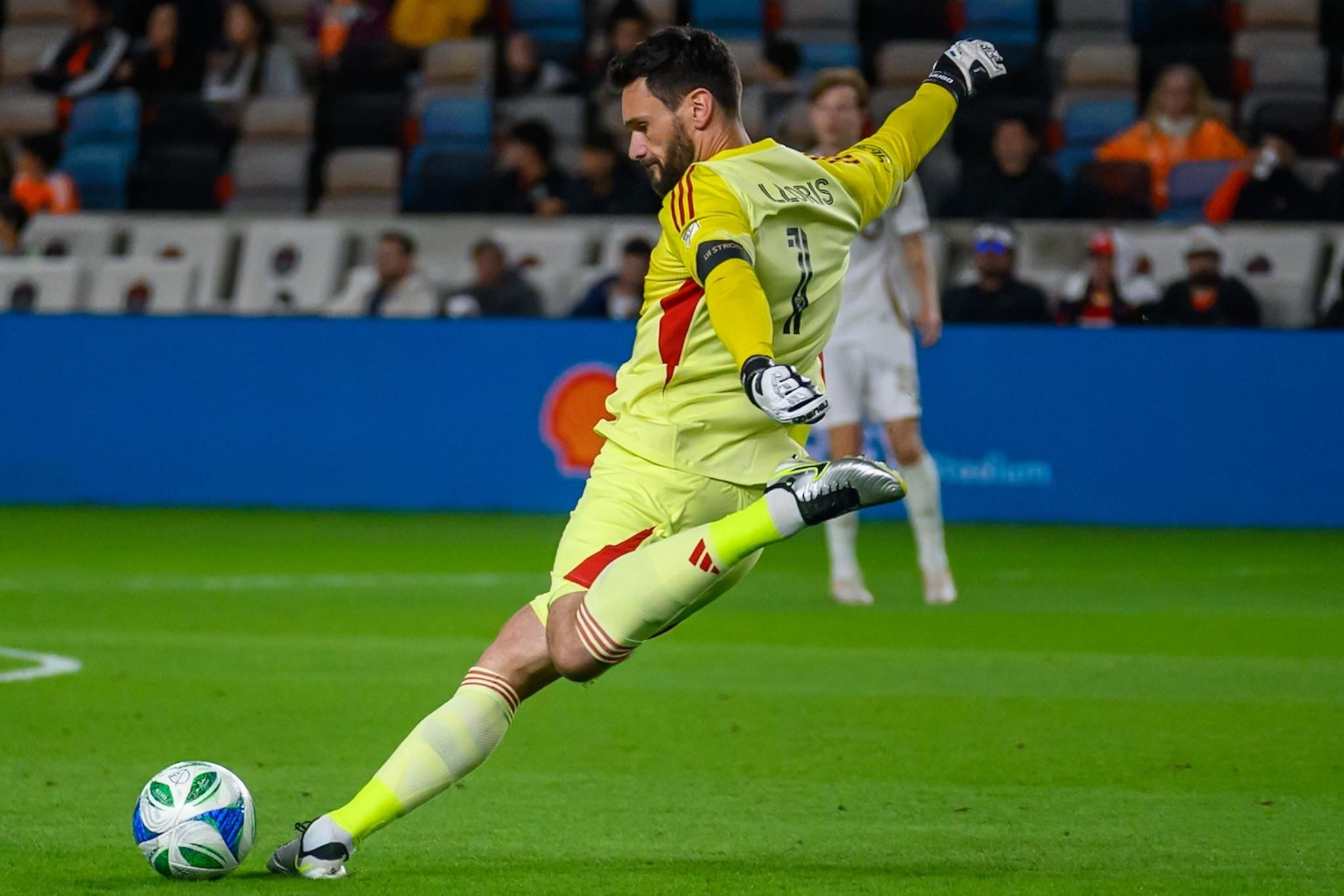
Lloris in 2025 playing for LAFC.

=== Los Angeles FC ===
On 30 December 2023, it was announced that Lloris had signed a contract for Major League Soccer club Los Angeles FC for the 2024 season, with options to extend in the following two years.

== International career ==
=== Youth ===
Lloris has been active on the international front with France, first appearing with the under-18 team making his debut on 11 March 2004 in a friendly match against Germany. He later played with the under-19 team and was part of the winning team at the 2005 UEFA European Under-19 Championship. Lloris appeared in all five matches the team played in the competition. He made only five appearances with the under-21 team, primarily because of his commitments to the senior team. On 11 October 2008, with the under-21 squad attempting to qualify for the 2009 European Under-21 Championship, coach Erick Mombaerts called up Lloris to the team for their important two-legged playoff against Germany, despite him having been called up to the senior team and the player having last played for the team in August 2007. Lloris honored the call up and started the second leg. With France seconds away from a spot in the tournament, because of the team's 1–1 draw in the first leg, Germany got a late goal from Benedikt Höwedes. The 1–0 loss eliminated France from the competition and also ended Lloris's under-21 career.

=== Senior ===
==== Early career ====
Lloris received his first call-up to the senior national team for France's 6 February 2008 match against Spain. However, he instead played for the B team in their friendly match against the Congo DR, held the day before the Spain friendly. After receiving several more call ups in 2008, he finally earned his first cap on 19 November 2008 in a 0–0 draw with Uruguay. On 9 September 2009, Lloris received his first international red card, against Serbia, following a foul on Nikola Žigić in the penalty box, despite replays showing otherwise. Lloris returned to the team on 14 October playing the entire 90 minutes in the team's 3–1 win over Austria.

==== 2010 FIFA World Cup ====
Lloris was applauded by the media and players alike for his performance over two legs against the Republic of Ireland that saw France earn a spot in the 2010 FIFA World Cup. Former national team goalkeeper Grégory Coupet credited his performance as "phenomenal", while the French media described him as "Saint Lloris", which is a play on the nickname of Real Madrid counterpart Iker Casillas, who was considered one of the top goalkeepers in Europe at the time.

On 11 May 2010, Lloris was named in Domenech's 30-man preliminary squad to participate in the 2010 World Cup, later being named to the final 23-man team and installed as first-choice goalkeeper. On 11 June 2010, Lloris made his World Cup debut in the team's opening group stage match against Uruguay, earning a clean sheet in a 0–0 draw. Lloris appeared in both of France's other group stage matches, against Mexico and hosts South Africa. Against South Africa, Lloris committed a goalkeeping error which resulted in the opening goal for the hosts. He redeemed himself later in the match, however, by producing several saves to limit the South Africans' chances of progressing to the knockout rounds. France lost the match 2–1, which resulted in the hosts' elimination from the competition.

==== UEFA Euro 2012 and 2014 FIFA World Cup ====
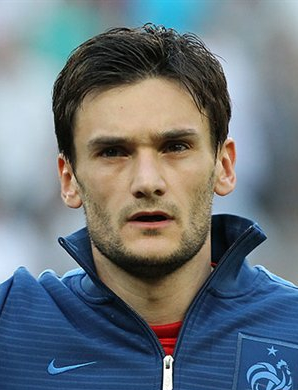
Lloris with France at UEFA Euro 2012

On 17 November 2010, Lloris captained France for the first time in the team's 2–1 victory over England at Wembley Stadium. After leading France out six more times on an interim basis, on 28 February 2012, he was named first-choice captain of the national team by manager Laurent Blanc ahead of UEFA Euro 2012. Lloris started for his country in the final tournament, as they reached the quarter-finals, where they were eliminated following a 2–0 loss to eventual champions Spain.

Lloris started for France at the 2014 World Cup, helping the team to the quarter-finals, where they were defeated 1–0 by eventual champions Germany.

==== UEFA Euro 2016 ====
Lloris was the starting goalkeeper of the French squad that reached the final of Euro 2016 on home soil, only to be defeated 1–0 by Portugal in extra time.

==== 2018 FIFA World Cup ====
On 2 June 2017, Lloris made his 88th appearance for France in a 5–0 friendly home win over Paraguay, overtaking Fabien Barthez as his nation's most capped goalkeeper of all time. After beating Bulgaria and Belarus in October later that year, Hugo Lloris and the France national team qualified for the 2018 World Cup.

On 21 June 2018, Lloris earned his 100th cap in France's 1–0 win over Peru in their second group stage game of the 2018 World Cup. Against Uruguay in the quarter-finals, Lloris kept a clean sheet and made a key save from a Martín Cáceres header as France won 2–0. On 15 July, he lifted the World Cup trophy as the team's captain, as France defeated Croatia with a 4–2 victory in the final, despite a mistake which allowed Croatia's Mario Mandžukić to score their second goal as Lloris tried to dribble past him.

==== 2018–19 UEFA Nations League, UEFA Euro 2020 and 2020–21 UEFA Nations League ====
On 17 November 2018, he made a record of 9 saves in a UEFA Nations League game against Netherlands, which France lost 2–0.

On 18 May 2021, Lloris was selected to the France squad for UEFA Euro 2020, which had been postponed by a year because of the COVID-19 pandemic. During France's match against Switzerland in the Round of 16 on 28 June 2021, he saved a penalty taken by Ricardo Rodriguez in the 55th minute of the game. The game eventually went into a penalty shoot-out after a 3–3 draw. Lloris failed to save a single Swiss penalty, and France were eliminated from the tournament.

On 10 October 2021, he played in the 2021 UEFA Nations League Final which ended in a 2–1 win for France against Spain, where he produced two late saves to ensure the victory.

==== 2022 FIFA World Cup and retirement ====
In November 2022, he was included in the French squad for the 2022 World Cup in Qatar. On 4 December, he tied Lilian Thuram's record for most capped player for the national team after starting against Poland. Six days later, on 10 December, he broke the record by reaching his 143rd cap, playing in a 2–1 win against England in the quarter-finals. He also played his 18th World Cup match, to be the most capped in the competition ahead of both Fabien Barthez and Thierry Henry. On 14 December, in the semi-final against Morocco, he made his 19th World Cup appearance, equaling the record for most matches played by a goalkeeper, with Germany's Manuel Neuer. On 18 December, he made his 20th World Cup appearance in the final, which Argentina eventually won 4–2 in the penalty shoot-out after the match ended 3–3 at extra-time. On 9 January 2023, Lloris, being the most capped player in the history of the national team, announced his retirement from international football at the age of 36. Lloris held the record for the most capped goalkeeper at the FIFA World Cup (20 appearances), until this was broken by Manuel Neuer in 2026.

== Style of play ==
Lloris is described as a goalkeeper who "boasts lightning reflexes and good decision-making" and is "a formidable opponent in one-on-one situations". Lloris also "commands his box well". His playing style, and in particular his speed when coming off his line to anticipate opponents and clear the ball, has led him to be described as a sweeper-keeper in the media. Lloris has been described as an "acrobatic shot-stopper," due to his athleticism in goal, and is considered to be one of the best goalkeepers in the world, as well as one of France's greatest goalkeepers ever, with his former Tottenham manager José Mourinho even describing him as "the best in the Premier League" in 2020. He also as a strong positional sense. He was less adept at stopping penalties, however. While he has been described in the media as being comfortable with the ball at his feet and generally reliable in his passing, he has also come into criticism due to some high-profile errors he has made in his entire career, which often resulted in goals, mainly due to his poor distribution and decision making when attempting to play out from the back. Moreover, while he is considered to be strong in one-on-one situations, and adept at claiming high balls, his ability to deal with crosses effectively has occasionally come into question in the media; he has also been accused of being inconsistent, and has frequently struggled with injuries throughout his career. Notwithstanding his reputation for being prone to errors, Adam Bate of Sky Sports described Lloris as "underrated" in 2020, however, and as an "elite shot-stopper," due to his agility and ability to produce numerous saves consistently throughout the course of a given season.

== Personal life ==
Lloris met his wife Marine while he was studying at the Lycée Thierry Maulnier in 2002. On 23 September 2010, he announced the birth of their daughter, Anna-Rose. They married at the Église Saint-François-de-Paule in Nice in 2012. Another daughter Giuliana was born in 2014 just before the World Cup in Brazil. Their son Léandro was born on 20 September 2019.

In 2008, while Lloris was playing for Nice, his mother died. Just two days after her death, he gained national respect for his refusal of a bereavement leave offer from manager Frédéric Antonetti, instead opting to play in a league match for Nice.

On 10 August 2010, Lloris was named, alongside international teammate Karim Benzema, to appear on the cover of the French version of FIFA 11.

On 24 August 2018, Lloris was charged with drink-driving after being stopped by police in west London. Lloris later pleaded guilty at Westminster Magistrates' Court and admitted to being more than twice the drink-drive limit. He was fined £50,000 and banned from driving for 20 months.

== Career statistics ==
=== Club ===
As of match played 1 November 2026

Appearances and goals by club, season and competition
Club	Season	League			National cup (Note: Includes Coupe de France, FA Cup, U.S. Open Cup)		League cup (Note: Includes Coupe de la Ligue, Football League/EFL Cup)		Continental		Other		Total	
Club	Season	Division	Apps	Goals	Apps	Goals	Apps	Goals	Apps	Goals	Apps	Goals	Apps	Goals
Nice II	2004–05	CFA	12	0	—		—		—		—		12	0
Nice II	2005–06	CFA	8	0	—		—		—		—		8	0
Nice II	Total		20	0	—		—		—		—		20	0
Nice	2005–06	Ligue 1	5	0	1	0	5	0	—		—		11	0
Nice	2006–07	Ligue 1	37	0	0	0	0	0	—		—		37	0
Nice	2007–08	Ligue 1	30	0	0	0	0	0	—		—		30	0
Nice	Total		72	0	1	0	5	0	—		—		78	0
Lyon	2008–09	Ligue 1	35	0	2	0	0	0	8 (Note: Appearances in UEFA Champions League)	0	1 (Note: Appearance in Trophée des Champions)	0	46	0
Lyon	2009–10	Ligue 1	36	0	2	0	0	0	14	0	—		52	0
Lyon	2010–11	Ligue 1	37	0	2	0	0	0	8	0	—		47	0
Lyon	2011–12	Ligue 1	36	0	4	0	3	0	10	0	—		53	0
Lyon	2012–13	Ligue 1	2	0	—		—		—		1	0	3	0
Lyon	Total		146	0	10	0	3	0	40	0	2	0	201	0
Tottenham Hotspur	2012–13	Premier League	27	0	0	0	1	0	5 (Note: Appearances in UEFA Europa League)	0	—		33	0
Tottenham Hotspur	2013–14	Premier League	37	0	1	0	1	0	6	0	—		45	0
Tottenham Hotspur	2014–15	Premier League	35	0	0	0	1	0	8	0	—		44	0
Tottenham Hotspur	2015–16	Premier League	37	0	0	0	0	0	9	0	—		46	0
Tottenham Hotspur	2016–17	Premier League	34	0	1	0	0	0	8 (Note: Six appearances in UEFA Champions League, two appearances in UEFA Europa League)	0	—		43	0
Tottenham Hotspur	2017–18	Premier League	36	0	0	0	0	0	7	0	—		43	0
Tottenham Hotspur	2018–19	Premier League	33	0	0	0	0	0	11	0	—		44	0
Tottenham Hotspur	2019–20	Premier League	21	0	2	0	0	0	4	0	—		27	0
Tottenham Hotspur	2020–21	Premier League	38	0	1	0	4	0	5	0	—		48	0
Tottenham Hotspur	2021–22	Premier League	38	0	2	0	2	0	1 (Note: Appearance in UEFA Europa Conference League)	0	—		43	0
Tottenham Hotspur	2022–23	Premier League	25	0	0	0	0	0	6	0	—		31	0
Tottenham Hotspur	2023–24	Premier League	0	0	—		0	0	—		—		0	0
Tottenham Hotspur	Total		361	0	7	0	9	0	70	0	—		447	0
Los Angeles FC	2024	MLS	33	0	3	0	—		—		10 (Note: Six appearances in Leagues Cup, four appearances in MLS Cup playoffs)	0	46	0
Los Angeles FC	2025	MLS	32	0	—		—		6 (Note: Appearances in CONCACAF Champions Cup)	0	7 (Note: One appearance in FIFA Club World Cup play-in, three appearances in FIFA Club World Cup, three appearances in MLS Cup playoffs)	0	45	0
Los Angeles FC	2026	MLS	29	0	—		—		7	0	2 (Note: Appearances in Leagues Cup)	0	38	0
Los Angeles FC	Total		94	0	3	0	—		12	0	19	0	129	0
Career total			693	0	21	0	17	0	123	0	21	0	875	0

=== International ===
Appearances and goals by national team and year
National team	Year	Apps	Goals
France	2008	1	0
France	2009	7	0
France	2010	11	0
France	2011	11	0
France	2012	13	0
France	2013	11	0
France	2014	11	0
France	2015	7	0
France	2016	13	0
France	2017	9	0
France	2018	14	0
France	2019	6	0
France	2020	6	0
France	2021	16	0
France	2022	9	0
Total		145	0

== Honours ==
Lyon

- Coupe de France: 2011–12
- Trophée des Champions: 2012

Tottenham Hotspur

- Football League Cup/EFL Cup runner-up: 2014–15, 2020–21
- UEFA Champions League runner-up: 2018–19

Los Angeles FC

- U.S. Open Cup: 2024
- Leagues Cup runner-up: 2024

France U19

- UEFA European Under-19 Championship: 2005

France

- FIFA World Cup: 2018; runner-up: 2022
- UEFA Nations League: 2020–21
- UEFA European Championship runner-up: 2016

Individual

- Toulon Tournament Best Goalkeeper: 2006
- Ligue 1 Goalkeeper of the Year: 2008–09, 2009–10, 2011–12
- Ligue 1 Team of the Year: 2008–09, 2009–10, 2011–12
- UNFP Player of the Month: September 2009
- MLS All-Star: 2024

Orders

- Knight of the Legion of Honour: 2018

== See also ==
- List of men's footballers with 1,000 or more official appearances
- List of men's footballers with 100 or more international caps
