= Timothy Tillman =

American soccer player (born 1999)

Timmy Tillman
Personal information
- Full name: Timothy Justin Tillman
- Date of birth: January 4, 1999 (age 27)
- Place of birth: Nuremberg, Germany
- Height: 1.83 m (6 ft 0 in)
- Position: Midfielder

Team information
- Current team: Los Angeles FC
- Number: 11

Youth career
- –2007: ASV Zirndorf
- 2007–2009: 1. SC Feucht
- 2009–2015: Greuther Fürth
- 2015–2017: Bayern Munich

Senior career*
Years	Team	Apps	(Gls)
2017–2020	Bayern Munich II	31	(6)
2018–2019	→ 1. FC Nürnberg (loan)	6	(0)
2018–2019	→ 1. FC Nürnberg II (loan)	7	(0)
2020–2023	Greuther Fürth	80	(2)
2023–	Los Angeles FC	101	(9)

International career^{‡}
2015	Germany U16	2	(0)
2015–2016	Germany U17	9	(1)
2016	Germany U18	4	(2)
2017–2018	Germany U19	5	(0)
2024–	United States	3	(0)
- * Club domestic league appearances and goals as of June 13, 2026 ‡ National team caps and goals as of November 18, 2025

Timothy "Timmy" Justin Tillman (born January 4, 1999) is a professional soccer player who plays as a midfielder for Major League Soccer club Los Angeles FC. Born in Germany, he represents the United States national team.

== Club career ==
=== Youth career ===
Tillman began his youth career with ASV Zirndorf, before moving to 1. SC Feucht in 2007. After two seasons, he joined the youth team of Greuther Fürth in 2009. In 2015, he moved from Fürth to the youth academy of Bundesliga club Bayern Munich for a fee of €500,000. Upon his departure, Fürth president Helmut Hack said, "Timothy Tillman is the biggest talent we have had for 30 years. His departure is a catastrophe for our club."

In 2017, he won the 2016–17 A-Junioren Bundesliga Süd/Südwest with Bayern's under-19 team, scoring five goals during the season. The team went on to advance to the final of the A-Junioren Bundesliga championship round, with Tillman scoring in the semi-final second leg against Schalke 04, before losing to Borussia Dortmund 8–7 on penalties.

=== Bayern Munich ===
Tillman began his senior career with Bayern Munich II in the 2017–18 season, making his debut in the Regionalliga Bayern on July 14, 2017 in a 5–0 home win against FC Ingolstadt II. He scored his first goal for the reserve team on 13 September 2017, scoring Bayern's second goal in a 2–1 away win against 1. FC Nürnberg II. He finished the 2017–18 season with 31 appearances and 6 goals in the Regionalliga.

=== 1. FC Nürnberg (loan) ===
On July 2, 2018, Tillman joined Bundesliga club 1. FC Nürnberg on loan for the 2018–19 season. He began his stint at the club with the reserve team, making his debut in the Regionalliga Bayern on 15 September 2018 in a 2–2 home draw against 1. FC Schweinfurt.

Tillman made his professional debut for the first team on March 10, 2019 in the Bundesliga, coming on as a substitute in the 52nd minute for the injured Enrico Valentini in the away match against 1899 Hoffenheim, which finished as a 1–2 loss.

=== Greuther Furth ===
Tillman requested a transfer back to his youth club, Greuther Fürth, which was granted by FC Bayern Munich on 3 January 2020. Both clubs refused to comment on the transfer fee. Tillman made his club debut on September 24, 2021 against Bayern Munich.

=== Los Angeles FC ===
On February 10, 2023, Tillman signed a two-year contract with Major League Soccer club Los Angeles FC. On 18 September 2025, Tillman signed a contract extension with LAFC until 2028, with an option for an additional year.

== International career ==
Tillman is eligible to represent Germany through his mother or the United States through his father. He began his youth international career with Germany, appearing for the under-16 to under-19 selections. He made five appearances for the under-19 side, including three in the qualification for the 2018 UEFA European Under-19 Championship, which Germany failed to qualify for.

In January 2018, it was announced that Tillman would switch to representing the United States internationally. He was to join a United States under-20 training camp in March 2018 under coach Tab Ramos, but still had to submit a formal request to FIFA in order to switch. He instead joined the Germany under-19 team in March 2018, appearing in a match against the Netherlands.

On May 12, 2023, FIFA approved Tillman's application for a one-time switch to represent the United States at the senior international level.

Tillman made his debut for the senior United States national team on January 20, 2024 in a friendly against Slovenia.

== Personal life ==
Tillman was born in Nuremberg, Germany, to an African-American father, serving in the U.S. Armed Forces, and German mother. However, he was raised by his single mother in Fürth, a city in northern Bavaria, Germany. He holds dual citizenship with Germany and the United States. His younger brother, Malik Tillman, is also a footballer, having also played for the youth teams of Greuther Fürth and Bayern Munich. Malik currently plays at Bayer Leverkusen and has represented Germany internationally at youth level and the United States at senior level.

== Career statistics ==
=== Club ===
As of match played August 21, 2025

Appearances and goals by club, season and competition
Club	Season	League			Playoffs		National cup (Note: Includes DFB-Pokal)		Continental		Other		Total	
Club	Season	Division	Apps	Goals	Apps	Goals	Apps	Goals	Apps	Goals	Apps	Goals	Apps	Goals
Bayern Munich II	2017–18	Regionalliga Bayern	31	6	—		—		—		—		31	6
1. FC Nürnberg (loan)	2018–19	Bundesliga	2	0	—		—		—		—		2	0
1. FC Nürnberg II (loan)	2018–19	Regionalliga Bayern	7	0	—		—		—		—		7	0
Greuther Fürth	2019–20	2. Bundesliga	12	0	—		—		—		—		12	0
Greuther Fürth	2020–21	2. Bundesliga	24	0	—		3	0	—		—		27	0
Greuther Fürth	2021–22	Bundesliga	29	1	—		1	0	—		—		30	1
Greuther Fürth	2022–23	2. Bundesliga	15	1	—		1	0	—		—		16	1
Greuther Fürth	Total		80	2	—		5	0	—		—		85	2
Los Angeles FC	2023	MLS	25	4	5	0	0	0	8 (Note: Appearances in CONCACAF Champions Cup)	1	1 (Note: Appearances in Leagues Cup)	0	39	5
Los Angeles FC	2024	MLS	32	4	4	0	5	2	—		1	0	42	6
Los Angeles FC	2025	MLS	22	0	0	0	—		0	0	0	0	22	0
Los Angeles FC	Total		79	8	9	0	5	2	8	1	2	0	103	11
Career total			199	16	9	0	10	2	8	1	2	0	228	19

=== International ===
As of match played November 18, 2025

Appearances and goals by national team and year
National team	Year	Apps	Goals
United States	2024	1	0
United States	2025	2	0
Total		3	0

== Honors ==
Bayern Munich

- DFL-Supercup: 2017

Los Angeles FC

- U.S. Open Cup: 2024

Individual

- 2023 MLS Team of the Matchday: Matchday 3, Matchday 5
