= Ryan Hollingshead =

American soccer player (born 1991)

- Hollingshead in 2026

Personal information
- Full name: Ryan Michael Hollingshead
- Date of birth: April 16, 1991 (age 35)
- Place of birth: Sacramento, California, U.S.
- Height: 6 ft 2 in (1.88 m)
- Position: Right-back

Team information
- Current team: Los Angeles FC
- Number: 24

College career
Years	Team	Apps	(Gls)
2009–2012	UCLA Bruins	81	(16)

Senior career*
Years	Team	Apps	(Gls)
2014–2021	FC Dallas	193	(18)
2022–	Los Angeles FC	107	(12)
- * Club domestic league appearances and goals as of June 18, 2025

Ryan Michael Hollingshead (born April 16, 1991) is an American professional soccer player who plays as a right-back for Major League Soccer club Los Angeles FC.

== Career ==
=== College ===
Hollingshead played college soccer at UCLA between 2009 and 2012. At UCLA, he played in 81 matches, scoring 16 goals and recording 21 assists (53 points). He earned All-Pac-12 honors three times in his career (2010–12) and was named the 2012 Pac-12 Player of the Year. In addition, Hollingshead earned NSCAA All-America honors in 2012 and was named to the 2011 NCAA All-Tournament Team after leading the Bruins to the College Cup semifinals. In 2012, he started all 19 of UCLA's matches, led the team with 22 points (7 goals, 8 assists), and finished the season tied for the team lead in goals. Hollingshead also captained the Bruins to a 13–3–3 record and finished second in the Pac-12 with 8 assists for the year.

=== Professional ===
FC Dallas selected Hollingshead in the second round (20th overall) of the 2013 MLS SuperDraft. Despite an offer from Dallas, Hollingshead opted not to accept, so that he could help his brother build a church in Sacramento and spend time in Haiti doing charity work at an orphanage.

Hollingshead signed with Dallas on December 9, 2013. Over the next few seasons, he established himself as a player who could play multiple positions, mostly as a fullback or wing on either side.

On January 6, 2017, while stopping to help a stranded motorist, Hollingshead was struck by a motor vehicle that had crashed due to icy conditions, launching him 30 feet (9.1 m) into the air. He sustained three broken vertebrae in his neck as a result of the collision. The injuries forced him to miss the start of the 2017 season. After the season, he was recognized as the MLS WORKS Humanitarian of the Year.

On February 10, 2022, Hollingshead was acquired by Los Angeles FC from FC Dallas in exchange for Marco Farfan.

== Career statistics ==
=== Club ===
As of match played October 6, 2024

Appearances and goals by club, season and competition
Club	Season	League			National cup (Note: Includes U.S. Open Cup)		Continental		Other (Note: Includes MLS Cup playoffs, Leagues Cup)		Total	
Club	Season	Division	Apps	Goals	Apps	Goals	Apps	Goals	Apps	Goals	Apps	Goals
FC Dallas	2014	MLS	11	0	1	0	—		1	0	13	0
FC Dallas	2015	MLS	33	2	2	0	—		4	1	39	3
FC Dallas	2016	MLS	29	2	3	0	4 (Note: Appearance(s) in CONCACAF Champions Cup)	0	2	0	38	2
FC Dallas	2017	MLS	18	0	3	1	—		—		21	1
FC Dallas	2018	MLS	18	1	1	0	2	0	1	0	22	1
FC Dallas	2019	MLS	34	6	2	0	—		1	0	37	6
FC Dallas	2020	MLS	20	4	—		—		2	0	22	4
FC Dallas	2021	MLS	30	3	—		—		—		30	3
FC Dallas	Total		193	18	12	1	6	0	11	1	222	20
LAFC	2022	MLS	30	6	3	1	—		3	0	36	7
LAFC	2023	MLS	32	4	—		7	0	8	4	47	8
LAFC	2024	MLS	31	1	3	0	—		7	1	41	2
LAFC	2025	MLS	0	0	—		0	0	0	0	0	0
LAFC	Total		93	11	6	1	7	0	18	5	124	17
Career total			286	29	18	2	13	0	29	6	346	37

== Honors ==
FC Dallas

- Supporters' Shield: 2016
- U.S. Open Cup: 2016

Los Angeles FC

- MLS Cup: 2022
- Supporters' Shield: 2022
- U.S. Open Cup: 2024

Individual

- MLS Humanitarian of the Year: 2017
- MLS All-Star: 2023
