= Lorenzo Dellavalle =

Italian footballer (born 2004)

Personal information
- Date of birth: 4 April 2004 (age 22)
- Place of birth: Carmagnola, Italy
- Height: 1.90 m (6 ft 3 in)
- Position: Defender

Youth career
- –2023: Juventus

Senior career*
Years	Team	Apps	(Gls)
2023	Los Angeles FC 2	6	(0)
2024–2026	Los Angeles FC	0	(0)

International career^{‡}
2021–2022	Italy U19	9	(0)
2022–2023	Italy U20	13	(0)
Medal record
Men's football
Representing Italy
UEFA European Under-19 Championship
Winner	2023 Malta
Mediterranean Games
Runner-up	Oran 2022	U-18 Team
- * Club domestic league appearances and goals as of 12:58, 21 August 2024 (UTC) ‡ National team caps and goals as of 12:58, 21 August 2024 (UTC)

Lorenzo Dellavalle (born 4 April 2004) is an Italian professional footballer who plays as a defender for Major League Soccer club Los Angeles FC.

== Early life ==
Dellavalle grew up in Carignano, Italy.

== Club career ==
Dellavalle played for the youth academy of Italian Serie A side Juventus, where he captained the club.

== International career ==
Dellavalle helped the Italy national under-19 football team win the 2023 UEFA European Under-19 Championship.

== Style of play ==
Dellavalle mainly operates as a central defender.

== Personal life ==
Dellavalle is the cousin of Italian footballer Alessandro Dellavalle.

== Honours ==
Italy U19

- UEFA European Under-19 Championship: 2023
