= Adrian Wibowo =

Indonesian footballer (born 2006)

Personal information
- Full name: Adrian Satriyo Wibowo
- Date of birth: 17 January 2006 (age 20)
- Place of birth: Los Angeles, California, United States
- Height: 1.83 m (6 ft 0 in)
- Position: Winger

Team information
- Current team: FC Wacker Innsbruck (on loan from Los Angeles FC)
- Number: 7

Youth career
- 2014–2018: Total Futbol Academy
- 2018–2023: Los Angeles FC

Senior career*
| Years | Team | Apps | (Gls) |
| 2023– | Los Angeles FC 2 | 50 | (15) |
| 2023– | Los Angeles FC | 2 | (0) |
| 2026– | → FC Wacker Innsbruck (loan) | 3 | (0) |

International career^{‡}
| 2022–2023 | United States U17 | 3 | (1) |
| 2025– | Indonesia | 1 | (0) |
- * Club domestic league appearances and goals as of 24 October 2026 ‡ National team caps and goals as of 8 September 2025

Adrian Satriyo Wibowo (born 17 January 2006) is a professional footballer who plays as a winger for 2. Liga club FC Wacker Innsbruck, on loan from Major League Soccer (MLS) club Los Angeles FC. Born in the United States, he plays for the Indonesia national team.

== Early life ==
Wibowo was born in Los Angeles, California to an Indonesian father and an American mother. He developed a passion for soccer at the age of 6, initially sparked by his enjoyment of kicking a ball. His father, Boogie, took an active role in nurturing this interest by providing training at home. In 2014, when Wibowo was 8 years old, his father signed him in the Total Futbol Academy (TFA). After four years of development, he transferred to the academy of Major League Soccer club Los Angeles FC, where he commenced his career with its under-13 team in 2018.

== Club career ==
In 2023, at the age of 17, Wibowo played for the Los Angeles FC reserve team, Los Angeles FC 2 competing in the MLS Next Pro. In this season, Wibowo has played 10 games and scored 2 goals in the domestic competition and managed to enter the 2023 MLS Next All-Star Game squad.

In the 2024 MLS Next Pro season, Wibowo has played 23 games and scored 10 goals. This achievement made him announced as one of the players registered to play for Los Angeles FC in the upcoming 2025 Major League Soccer season.

== International career ==
Wibowo is eligible to play for his country of birth, United States, and Indonesia, as his father is Indonesian.

In 2022, he represented the United States national under-17 team. Wibowo participated in three matches and netted one goal. The solitary goal was scored during a match against the Belgium U17 on 7 May 2022, contributing to a decisive 3–0 victory for the US side.

On 3 September 2025, LAFC confirmed Wibowo's first call-up to the Indonesia national football team. On 8 September, he made his debut against Lebanon in a 0–0 draw.

== Career statistics ==
=== Club ===
As of 2 February 2026

| Club | Season | League | | | US Open Cup | | Continental | | Other | | Total | |
| Club | Season | Division | Apps | Goals | Apps | Goals | Apps | Goals | Apps | Goals | Apps | Goals |
|---|---|---|---|---|---|---|---|---|---|---|---|---|
| Los Angeles FC 2 | 2023 | MLS Next Pro | 10 | 2 | — | | — | | — | | 10 | 2 |
| Los Angeles FC 2 | 2024 | MLS Next Pro | 23 | 9 | — | | — | | — | | 23 | 9 |
| Los Angeles FC 2 | 2025 | MLS Next Pro | 16 | 4 | — | | — | | — | | 16 | 4 |
| Los Angeles FC 2 | 2026 | MLS Next Pro | 1 | 0 | — | | — | | — | | 1 | 0 |
| Los Angeles FC 2 | Total | | 50 | 15 | — | | — | | — | | 50 | 15 |
| Los Angeles FC | 2025 | Major League Soccer | 2 | 0 | 1 | 0 | — | | — | | 3 | 0 |
| Career total | | | 52 | 15 | 1 | 0 | 0 | 0 | 0 | 0 | 53 | 15 |

=== International ===
As of match played 8 September 2025

Appearances and goals by national team and year
| National team | Year | Apps | Goals |
|---|---|---|---|
| Indonesia | 2025 | 1 | 0 |
| Total | | 1 | 0 |
