= Diego Rosales (soccer) =

American-born Mexican soccer player

Personal information
- Full name: Diego Rosales Zamarripa
- Date of birth: November 1, 2005 (age 20)
- Place of birth: South Gate, California, United States
- Height: 5 ft 10 in (1.77 m)
- Position: Defender

Team information
- Current team: Guadalajara
- Number: 195

Youth career
- 2016–2023: Los Angeles FC

Senior career*
Years	Team	Apps	(Gls)
2021	Las Vegas Lights	4	(0)
2023–2024	Los Angeles FC 2	44	(1)
2023–2024	Los Angeles FC	0	(0)
2025–	Guadalajara	0	(0)
2026–	→ Tapatío	2	(0)

International career
2025–	Mexico	0	(0)
- * Club domestic league appearances and goals as of October 18, 2026

Diego Rosales Zamarripa (born November 1, 2005) is a professional soccer player who plays as a defender for Liga MX club Guadalajara. Born in the United States, he represents Mexico at international level.

== Club career ==
Born in South Gate, California, Rosales joined the youth academy at Los Angeles FC in 2016, being part of the club's inaugural under-12 side. In January 2020, at just age 14, Rosales was called into the Los Angeles FC first-team for their pre-season camp. He made his unofficial debut for the senior side on January 25, 2020, in a friendly against Peñarol, appearing in the second half.

=== Las Vegas Lights ===
On May 5, 2021, Rosales joined Las Vegas Lights, an affiliate club of Los Angeles FC, on a USL academy contract. He made his professional debut that night in the USL Championship against LA Galaxy II. Rosales came on as a 66th-minute substitute for Raheem Edwards as Las Vegas Lights were defeated 0–5.

=== Los Angeles FC ===
On June 21, 2023, Rosales signed a homegrown player contract with Los Angeles FC.

== Personal life ==
Rosales is of Mexican descent, with roots in Villa de Hidalgo, San Luis Potosí.

== Career statistics ==
=== Club ===
As of October 18, 2026

Appearances and goals by club, season and competition
Club	Season	League			National Cup		Continental		Other		Total	
Club	Season	Division	Apps	Goals	Apps	Goals	Apps	Goals	Apps	Goals	Apps	Goals
Las Vegas Lights	2021	USL Championship	4	0	—		—		—		4	0
Las Vegas Lights	2023	USL Championship	—		2	0	—		—		2	0
Las Vegas Lights	Total		4	0	2	0	—		—		6	0
Los Angeles FC 2	2023	MLS Next Pro	21	0	—		—		—		21	0
Los Angeles FC 2	2024	MLS Next Pro	23	1	—		—		—		23	1
Los Angeles FC 2	Total		44	1	—		—		—		44	1
Tapatío	2026–27	Liga de Expansión MX	2	0	—		—		—		2	0
Career total			50	1	2	0	0	0	0	0	52	1
