= 2023 Los Angeles FC season =

Los Angeles FC
2023 season
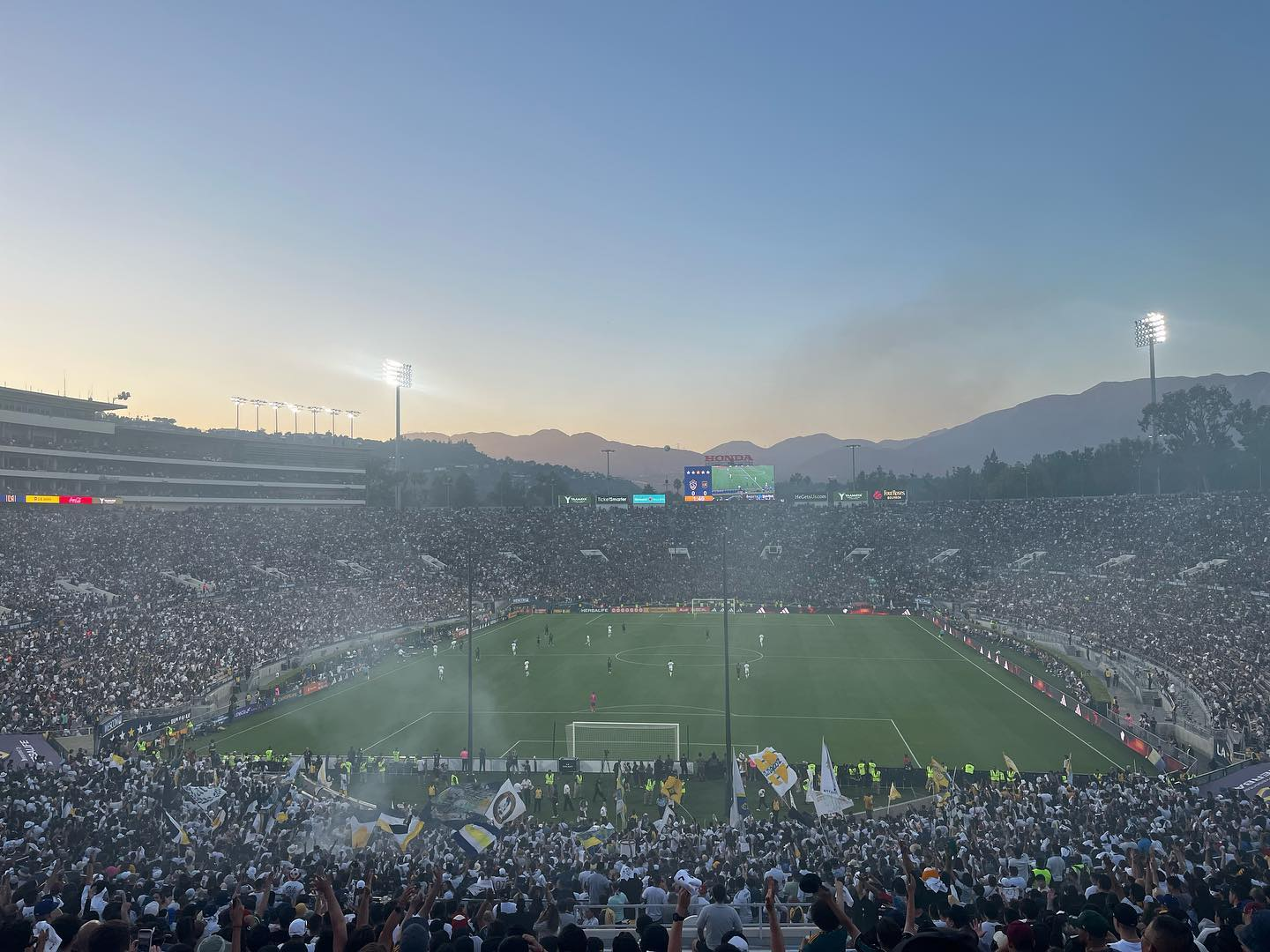
- An El Tráfico match at the Rose Bowl on July 4, 2023
- General manager: John Thorrington
- Head coach: Steve Cherundolo
- Stadium: BMO Stadium
- MLS: Conference: 3rd Overall: 8th
- MLS Cup Playoffs: Runners-up
- U.S. Open Cup: Round of 16
- CONCACAF Champions League: Runners-up
- Leagues Cup: Quarter-finals
- Campeones Cup: Runners-up
- Top goalscorer: League: Denis Bouanga (20); All: Denis Bouanga (38)
- Average home league attendance: 22,155
- Biggest win: LAFC 5–1 MIN (10/4) (MLS); LAFC 7–1 FCJ (8/2) (Leagues Cup)
- Biggest defeat: HOU 4–0 LAFC (6/10)
Home colors	Away colors

The 2023 Los Angeles FC season was the club's sixth season in Major League Soccer, the top tier of the American soccer pyramid. LAFC plays its home matches at BMO Stadium in the Exposition Park neighborhood of Los Angeles, California. The venue was renamed prior to the start of the season.

LAFC finished as runners-up in MLS Cup 2023 to the Columbus Crew and the CONCACAF Champions League to Club León. The team traveled over 63,000 miles (101,000 km) over the course of the season and played 53 matches—a record at the time for an MLS team during a single year.

== Squad ==
=== First-team roster ===
As of October 21, 2023

No.	Name	Nationality	Pos	Date of birth (age)	Apps	Goals
1	Eldin Jakupović	Switzerland	GK	October 2, 1984 (age 41)	2	0
16	Maxime Crépeau	Canada	GK	May 11, 1994 (age 32)	7	0
32	Abraham Romero	Mexico	GK	February 18, 1998 (age 28)	0	0
77	John McCarthy	United States	GK	July 4, 1992 (age 34)	25	0
2	Denil Maldonado	Honduras	DF	May 26, 1998 (age 28)	21	1
3	Jesús Murillo	Colombia	DF	February 18, 1994 (age 32)	19	0
5	Mamadou Fall	Senegal	DF	November 21, 2002 (age 23)	1	0
12	Diego Palacios (INTL)	Ecuador	DF	July 12, 1999 (age 27)	29	0
14	Giorgio Chiellini (INTL)	Italy	DF	August 14, 1984 (age 41)	20	1
15	Mohamed Traore	Senegal	DF	August 15, 2002 (age 23)	0	0
18	Erik Dueñas (HG)	United States	DF	October 18, 2004 (age 21)	18	0
24	Ryan Hollingshead	United States	DF	April 16, 1991 (age 35)	32	4
28	Tony Leone (HG)	United States	DF	April 28, 2004 (age 22)	0	0
30	Sergi Palencia	Spain	DF	March 23, 1996 (age 30)	20	0
33	Aaron Long	United States	DF	October 12, 1992 (age 33)	21	0
80	Julian Gaines	United States	DF	November 5, 2002 (age 23)	2	0
6	Ilie Sánchez	Spain	MF	November 21, 1990 (age 35)	34	1
8	Francisco Ginella (INTL)	Uruguay	MF	January 21, 1999 (age 27)	0	0
11	Timothy Tillman	United States	MF	January 4, 1999 (age 27)	25	4
17	Daniel Crisostomo	United States	MF	January 16, 1997 (age 29)	6	0
19	Mateusz Bogusz	Poland	MF	August 22, 2001 (age 24)	28	3
23	Kellyn Acosta	United States	MF	July 24, 1995 (age 30)	24	0
50	Filip Krastev	Bulgaria	MF	October 15, 2001 (age 24)	9	1
7	Stipe Biuk	Croatia	FW	December 26, 2002 (age 23)	30	3
9	Mario González	Spain	FW	February 25, 1996 (age 30)	8	1
10	Carlos Vela (DP)	Mexico	FW	March 1, 1989 (age 37)	34	9
21	Christian Torres (HG)	United States	FW	April 15, 2004 (age 22)	0	0
25	Cristian Olivera	Uruguay	FW	April 17, 2002 (age 24)	10	2
27	Nathan Ordaz (HG)	Mexico	FW	January 12, 2004 (age 22)	17	0
99	Denis Bouanga	Gabon	FW	November 11, 1994 (age 31)	31	20

=== Los Angeles FC 2 players that made MLS appearances ===
No.	Name	Nationality	Pos	Date of birth (age)	Apps	Goals
38	Yekeson Subah	United States	FW	February 13, 2004 (age 22)	1	0

=== Coaching staff ===
As of February 21, 2023

Technical staff
Head coach	(United States) Steve Cherundolo
Assistant coach	(Canada) Marc Dos Santos
Assistant coach	(United States) Ante Razov
Assistant/Goalkeeping coach	(North Macedonia) Oka Nikolov
Assistant coach/Performance director	(South Africa) Gavin Benjafield
Co-President & General Manager	(United States) John Thorrington
Director of football operations	(Mexico) Marco Garcés

== Transfers ==
=== Transfers in ===
Entry date	Position	Player	From club	Notes	Ref.
December 30, 2022	FW	(Croatia) Stipe Biuk	(Croatia) Hajduk Split	Transfer	
January 4, 2023	DF	(United States) Aaron Long	(United States) New York Red Bulls	Free agent	
January 9, 2023	GK	(Switzerland) Eldin Jakupović	(England) Everton	Transfer	
January 26, 2023	MF	(United States) Daniel Crisostomo	(United States) Las Vegas Lights	Transfer	
January 26, 2023	GK	(United States) Abraham Romero	(United States) Las Vegas Lights	Transfer	
February 2, 2023	DF	(Spain) Sergi Palencia	(France) Saint-Étienne	Transfer	
February 10, 2023	MF	(United States) Timothy Tillman	(Germany) Greuther Fürth	Transfer	
March 31, 2023	MF	(Poland) Mateusz Bogusz	(England) Leeds United	Transfer	
June 9, 2023	MF	(United States) Bajung Darboe		Homegrown signing	
June 21, 2023	DF	(United States) Diego Rosales	(United States) Los Angeles FC 2	Homegrown signing	
July 22, 2023	FW	(Spain) Mario González	(Portugal) Braga	Transfer	
August 4, 2023	FW	(Uruguay) Cristian Olivera	(Spain) Almería	Transfer	

=== Transfers out ===
Exit date	Position	Player	To club	Notes	Ref.
November 15, 2022	FW	(United States) Cal Jennings	(United States) Tampa Bay Rowdies	Declined contract options	
November 15, 2022	GK	(El Salvador) Tomás Romero	(Canada) Toronto FC	Declined contract options	
November 15, 2022	MF	(Mexico) Daniel Trejo	(United States) Phoenix Rising	Declined contract options	
November 15, 2022	DF	(Argentina) Franco Escobar	(United States) Houston Dynamo	Free agent	
November 15, 2022	DF	(United States) Sebastien Ibeagha	(United States) FC Dallas	Free agent	
November 15, 2022	MF	(Ecuador) Sebastian Méndez	(Brazil) São Paulo	Free agent	
November 15, 2022	FW	(Spain) Cristian Tello	(Saudi Arabia) Al Fateh	Free agent	
January 3, 2023	MF	(Ghana) Latif Blessing	(United States) New England Revolution	Trade	
January 9, 2023	FW	(Wales) Gareth Bale	N/A	Retired	
February 1, 2023	FW	(Colombia) Cristian Arango	(Mexico) Pachuca	Transfer	
July 5, 2023	FW	(Ghana) Kwadwo Opoku	(Canada) CF Montréal	Trade	
August 3, 2023	MF	(Ecuador) José Cifuentes	(Scotland) Rangers	Transfer	

=== Loans in ===
Position	Player	From Club	Start date	End date	Notes	Ref.
DF	(Honduras) Denil Maldonado	(Honduras) Motagua	December 22, 2022	December 31, 2023	Loan with purchase option	
MF	(Bulgaria) Filip Krastev	(Belgium) Lommel	July 26, 2023	July 26, 2024	Year-long loan with purchase option	

=== Loans out ===
No.	Player	To Club	Start date	End date	Notes	Ref.
8	(Uruguay) Francisco Ginella	(Uruguay) Nacional	July 18, 2022	June 2024	Loan; Extended June 21, 2023	
15	(Senegal) Mohamed Traore	(United States) Phoenix Rising	February 28, 2023	December 31, 2023	Season-long loan	
5	(Senegal) Mamadou Fall	(Spain) Barcelona B	September 1, 2023	June 2024	Year-long loan with purchase option	

=== Draft picks ===
Round	#	Position	Player	College/Club Team	Reference
1	No Draft Selection				
2	58	GK	(United Arab Emirates) Jassem Koleilat	University of New Hampshire	
3	87	DF	(United States) Noah Dollenmayer	CSU, San Bernardino	

== Competitions ==
Win Draw Loss

All matches are in Pacific Time

=== Preseason ===
January 21 1	Los Angeles FC	0–2	Real Salt Lake	Los Angeles
11:00 AM			Jacquesson 10'; Rubin 65' (pen.)	Stadium: Los Angeles Football Club Performance Center; Attendance: 0
Note: Played behind closed doors.

January 28 2	Los Angeles FC	1–1	New York City FC	Los Angeles
	30'	Report	Magno 32' (pen.)	Stadium: Los Angeles Football Club Performance Center
Note: Played behind closed doors.

February 18 3	Los Angeles FC	3–1	San Diego Loyal	Los Angeles
5:00 PM	Vela 21'; Opoku 57'; Bouanga 83'		Moon 38'	Stadium: BMO Stadium

==== Coachella Valley Invitational ====
February 6 1	Los Angeles FC	1–2	D.C. United	Indio, California
2:00 PM	Bouanga		68'; 90+8'	Stadium: Empire Polo Club

February 11 2	Los Angeles FC	2–1	Toronto FC	Indio, California
11:00 AM	Bouanga,		Vázquez 6'	Stadium: Empire Polo Club

=== MLS ===
==== Standings ====
===== Western Conference =====
MLS Western Conference table (2023)
Pos	Team	Pld	W	L	T	GF	GA	GD	Pts	Qualification
1	St. Louis City SC	34	17	12	5	62	45	+17	56	Qualification for round one and the CONCACAF Champions Cup Round One
2	Seattle Sounders FC	34	14	9	11	41	32	+9	53	Qualification for round one
3	Los Angeles FC	34	14	10	10	54	39	+15	52	Qualification for round one
4	Houston Dynamo FC	34	14	11	9	51	38	+13	51	Qualification for round one
5	Real Salt Lake	34	14	12	8	48	50	−2	50	Qualification for round one

Source: MLS
Rules for classification: 1) points; 2) total wins; 3) total goal differential; 4) total goals scored; 5) fewer disciplinary points; 6) away goal differential; 7) away goals scored; 8) home goals differential; 9) home goals scored; 10) coin toss (2 clubs tied) or drawing of lots (≥3 clubs tied)

===== Overall =====
Overall MLS standings table
Pos	Team	Pld	W	L	T	GF	GA	GD	Pts	Qualification
6	New England Revolution	34	15	9	10	58	46	+12	55	Qualification for the CONCACAF Champions Cup Round One (Note: As second highest-ranked club in 2023 MLS Supporters' Shield not already qualified)
7	Seattle Sounders FC	34	14	9	11	41	32	+9	53	Qualification for the U.S. Open Cup Round of 32 (Note: As one of the top seven teams in the overall table to not qualify for the 2024 CONCACAF Champions Cup)
8	Los Angeles FC	34	14	10	10	54	39	+15	52	Qualification for the U.S. Open Cup Round of 32
9	Houston Dynamo FC (U)	34	14	11	9	51	38	+13	51	Qualification for the CONCACAF Champions Cup Round One and U.S. Open Cup Round of 32 (Note: Qualify for both the Champions Cup and U.S. Open Cup as 2023 U.S. Open Cup champions)
10	Atlanta United FC	34	13	9	12	66	53	+13	51	Qualification for the U.S. Open Cup Round of 32

Source: MLS
Rules for classification: 1) points; 2) total wins; 3) total goal differential; 4) total goals scored; 5) fewer disciplinary points; 6) away goal differential; 7) away goals scored; 8) home goals differential; 9) home goals scored; 10) coin toss (2 clubs tied) or drawing of lots (≥3 clubs tied)
(U) U.S. Open Cup winner

==== Matches ====
All matches are in Pacific time

March 4 1	Los Angeles FC	3–2	Portland Timbers	Los Angeles
1:30 PM	Chiellini 24'; Vela 34' (pen.); Ilie (yellow card) 45+1'; Hollingshead (yellow card) 45+8'; Opoku 52'; Tillman (yellow card) 72'	Report	McGraw (yellow card) 41'; Evander 62'; Paredes 84'; Fogaça (yellow card) 90+1'	Stadium: BMO Stadium; Attendance: 22,202; Referee: Joseph Dickerson

March 12 2	Los Angeles FC	4–0	New England Revolution	Los Angeles
7:30 PM	Bouanga 14' (pen.), 67'; Tillman 83'; Biuk 90+6'	Report	Polster (yellow card) 67'	Stadium: BMO Stadium; Attendance: 22,007; Referee: Allen Chapman

March 18 3	Seattle Sounders FC	0–0	Los Angeles FC	Seattle, Washington
1:00 PM	João Paulo (yellow card) 35'; Nouhou (yellow card) 43'; Rusnák (yellow card) 45'; A. Roldán (yellow card) 56'	Report	Long (yellow card) 43'; Murillo (yellow card) 43'; Acosta (yellow card) 48'; Bouanga (yellow card) 84'	Stadium: Lumen Field; Attendance: 32,515; Referee: Ismail Elfath

March 25 4	Los Angeles FC	2–1	FC Dallas	Los Angeles
7:30 PM	Tillman 3'; Murillo (yellow card) 37'; Hollingshead (yellow card) 69'; Bounga 84'	Report	Twumasi (red card) 34'; Velasco (yellow card) 40'; Quignon (yellow card) 43'; Ibeagha (yellow card) 53'; Cerrillo (yellow card) 63'; Tafari (yellow card) 66', (goal) 73'	Stadium: BMO Stadium; Attendance: 22,163; Referee: Lukasz Szpala
Note: FC Dallas head coach Nico Estévez was shown a yellow card (45+4').

April 1 5	Colorado Rapids	0–0	Los Angeles FC	Commerce City, Colorado
6:30 PM	Barrios (yellow card) 87'	Report	Long (yellow card) 65'	Stadium: Dick's Sporting Goods Park; Attendance: 16,298; Referee: Drew Fischer

April 8 6	Los Angeles FC	3–0	Austin FC	Los Angeles
4:30 PM	Bouanga 40', 58', 68'	Report	Lima (yellow card) 67'	Stadium: BMO Stadium; Attendance: 22,199; Referee: Victor Rivas

April 16 7	LA Galaxy	2–3	Los Angeles FC	Carson, California
1:30 PM	Boyd 41'; Aude (yellow card) 73'; Delgado 84'; Puig (yellow card) 90'; Joveljić (yellow card) 90+4'	Report	Acosta (yellow card) 19'; Vela 22', 68' (pen.); Palacios (yellow card) 60'; Cifuentes (yellow card) 63'; Hollingshead 70'; Palencia (yellow card) 90+1'	Stadium: Dignity Health Sports Park; Attendance: 27,154; Referee: Armando Villarreal

April 22 8	Nashville SC	1–1	Los Angeles FC	Nashville, Tennessee
5:30 PM	Mukhtar 35'	Report	Maldonado (yellow card) 8'; Bouanga 59'; Dueñas (yellow card) 69'; Murillo (yellow card) 88'	Stadium: Geodis Park; Attendance: 30,109; Referee: Ted Unkel

May 6 9	San Jose Earthquakes	2–1	Los Angeles FC	Santa Clara, California
4:30 PM	Espinoza 8', 83' (pen.)	Report	Bogusz (yellow card) 29'; Bouanga 30'; Maldonado (yellow card) 83'	Stadium: Levi's Stadium; Attendance: 45,112; Referee: Rubiel Vazquez

May 13 10	Real Salt Lake	0–3	Los Angeles FC	Sandy, Utah
6:30 PM	Ojeda (yellow card) 27'; Eneli (yellow card) 79'	Report	Opoku 8'; Bouanga 34'; Hollingshead (yellow card) 68'; Bogusz 87' (pen.)	Stadium: America First Field; Attendance: 19,407; Referee: Pierre-Luc Lauziere

May 17 11	Los Angeles FC	1–1	Sporting Kansas City	Los Angeles
7:30 PM	Bouanga 13'; Ilie (yellow card) 29'; Palacios (yellow card) 40'; Tillman (yellow card) 70'	Report	Russell 20'; Sallói (yellow card) 90+4'	Stadium: BMO Stadium; Attendance: 22,222; Referee: Armando Villarreal

May 20 12	Los Angeles FC	2–1	San Jose Earthquakes	Los Angeles
7:30 PM	Biuk 3'; Maldonado (yellow card) 29'; Vela 90+5' (pen.)	Report	Trauco 52'; Judson (yellow card) 89'	Stadium: BMO Stadium; Attendance: 22,030; Referee: Ismail Elfath

June 7 13	Los Angeles FC	0–0	Atlanta United FC	Los Angeles
7:30 PM	Palacios (yellow card) 18'; Cifuentes (yellow card) 23'; Crisostomo (yellow card) 90+6'	Report	Ibarra (yellow card) 28'; Rossetto (yellow card) 61'; Purata (yellow card) 70'; Fortune (yellow card) 85'; Wolff (yellow card) 90+5'	Stadium: BMO Stadium; Attendance: 22,010; Referee: Joseph Dickerson
Note: Match was rescheduled due to Los Angeles FC's participation in 2023 CONCACAF Champions League.

June 10 14	Houston Dynamo FC	4–0	Los Angeles FC	Houston, Texas
5:30 PM	Quiñónes 11'; Bassi 50'; Clark (yellow card) 53'; Baird 69', (yellow card) 81'; Escobar (yellow card) 79', (goal) 89'	Report	Cifuentes (yellow card) 32'	Stadium: Shell Energy Stadium; Attendance: 15,366; Referee: Alex Chilowicz

June 14 15	Los Angeles FC	0–1	Houston Dynamo FC	Los Angeles
7:30 PM	Biuk (yellow card) 22'; Ilie (yellow card) 27'; Opoku (red card) 79'; Palacios (yellow card) 89'	Report	Micael 23'; Clark (yellow card) 64'; Artur (yellow card) 76'; Sviatchenko (yellow card) 90+2'; Baird (yellow card); Steres (yellow card) 90+3'	Stadium: BMO Stadium; Attendance: 22,177; Referee: Guido Gonzalez Jr.
Note: Originally scheduled for April 29, match was rescheduled due to Los Angeles FC's participation in the 2023 CONCACAF Champions League.

June 17 16	Sporting Kansas City	1–2	Los Angeles FC	Kansas City, Kansas
5:30 PM	Pulido 17' (pen.); Rosero (yellow card) 50'	Report	Maldonado 48'; Bogusz (yellow card) 59'; Biuk (yellow card) 65'; Vela 90'	Stadium: Children's Mercy Park; Attendance: 19,410; Referee: Rosendo Mendoza

June 21 17	Los Angeles FC	1–0	Seattle Sounders FC	Los Angeles
7:30 PM	Bogusz 1'; Opoku (yellow card) 35'	Report	Lodeiro (yellow card) 61'	Stadium: BMO Stadium; Attendance: 22,125; Referee: Ted Unkel

June 24 18	Los Angeles FC	2–3	Vancouver Whitecaps FC	Los Angeles
7:30 PM	Crisostomo (yellow card) 25'; Bouanga 45'; Vela 68'; Hollingshead (yellow card) 86'	Report	Veselinović 2'; White 23'; Raposo (yellow card) 32'; Gauld 63'; Vite (yellow card) 85'; Martins (yellow card) 90+1'	Stadium: BMO Stadium; Attendance: 22,133; Referee: Jon Freemon

July 1 19	FC Dallas	2–0	Los Angeles FC	Frisco, Texas
5:30 PM	Jesus (yellow card) 24'; Kamungo 56'; Junqua 90'; Mulato (yellow card) 90+3'	Report	Palacios (yellow card) 8'	Stadium: Toyota Stadium; Attendance: 19,096; Referee: Sergii Boiko

July 4 20	LA Galaxy	2–1	Los Angeles FC	Pasadena, California
7:30 PM	Boyd 26'; Edwards (yellow card) 34'; Costa (yellow card) 54'; Aude (yellow card) 72'; Puig 73'	Report	Tillman (yellow card) 19'; Ilie 57'; Maldonado (yellow card) 70'; Dueñas (yellow card) 82'	Stadium: Rose Bowl; Attendance: 82,110; Referee: Victor Rivas
Note: Match was originally scheduled for February 25, but was postponed and later rescheduled due to severe weather.

July 8 21	Los Angeles FC	1–1	San Jose Earthquakes	Los Angeles
7:30 PM	Bouanga 37' (pen.)	Report	Mensah (yellow card) 22'; Gruezo (yellow card) 27'; Espinoza 30'; Daniel (red card) 56'; Marcinkowski (yellow card) 90+2'	Stadium: BMO Stadium; Attendance: 22,033; Referee: Lukasz Szpala

July 12 22	Los Angeles FC	3–0	St. Louis City SC	Los Angeles
7:30 PM	Cifuentes (yellow card) 14', (goal) 90+2'; Maldonado (yellow card) 30'; Vela 72'; Biuk 82'	Report	Bell (yellow card) 51'; Nerwinski (yellow card) 77'	Stadium: BMO Stadium; Attendance: 22,010; Referee: Joseph Dickerson
Note: Match was rescheduled due to Los Angeles FC's participation in 2023 CONCACAF Champions League.

July 15 23	Minnesota United FC	1–1	Los Angeles FC	Saint Paul, Minnesota
5:30 PM	Reynoso 24'; Taylor (yellow card) 45'	Report	Vela 21'; Palacios (yellow card) 40'; Ilie (yellow card) 44'	Stadium: Allianz Field; Attendance: 19,954; Referee: Allen Chapman

August 23 24	Los Angeles FC	4–0	Colorado Rapids	Los Angeles
7:30 PM	Chiellini (yellow card) 5'; Bogusz 19', (yellow card) 49'; Vela 29'; Hollingshead 36'; Palencia (yellow card) 43'; Olivera 83'	Report	Tavares (yellow card) 45+1'; Wilson (yellow card) 55'; Navarro (yellow card) 65'; Ronan (yellow card) 72'; Priso (yellow card) 89'	Stadium: BMO Stadium; Attendance: 22,017; Referee: Guido Gonzales Jr.
Note: Match rescheduled from August 20 due to Hurricane Hilary making landfall in Southern California.

August 26 25	Charlotte FC	2–1	Los Angeles FC	Charlotte, North Carolina
4:30 PM	Malanda (yellow card) 8'; Świderski (yellow card) 13'; Westwood 29'; Arfield 75'; Bronico (yellow card) 90+6'	Report	Tillman (yellow card) 19'; González 67'	Stadium: Bank of America Stadium; Attendance: 37,809; Referee: Victor Rivas

September 3 26	Los Angeles FC	1–3	Inter Miami CF	Los Angeles
7:30 PM	Bogusz (yellow card) 3'; Murillo (yellow card) 79'; Bouanga (yellow card) 88'; Hollingshead 90'	Report	Farías 14', (yellow card) 72'; Alba 51'; Yedlin (yellow card) 63'; Campana 83'; Gómez (yellow card) 86'	Stadium: BMO Stadium; Attendance: 22,921; Referee: Ted Unkel
Note: Originally scheduled for September 2

September 9 27	Portland Timbers	2–0	Los Angeles FC	Portland, Oregon
7:30 PM	Mabiala 28'; Bravo 53'; Paredes (yellow card) 82'	Report	Acosta (yellow card) 57'	Stadium: Providence Park; Attendance: 23,239; Referee: Drew Fischer

September 16 28	Los Angeles FC	4–2	LA Galaxy	Los Angeles
7:30 PM	Ilie (yellow card) 7'; Palacios (yellow card) 13'; Bouanga 24', 75'; Hollingshead 33', (yellow card) 66'; Tillman 84'; Acosta (yellow card) 90'	Report	Sharp 25'; Cuevas (yellow card) 43'; Yoshida 59'	Stadium: BMO Stadium; Attendance: 22,132; Referee: Chris Penso

September 20 29	St. Louis City SC	0–0	Los Angeles FC	St. Louis, Missouri
5:30 PM	Markanich (yellow card) 89'; Ostrák (yellow card) 90+2'	Report	Palencia (yellow card) 53'; Acosta (yellow card) 84'	Stadium: CityPark; Attendance: 22,423; Referee: Rubiel Vazquez

September 23 30	Philadelphia Union	0–0	Los Angeles FC	Chester, Pennsylvania
4:30 PM			Long (yellow card) 2'; Palencia (yellow card) 79'	Stadium: Subaru Park; Attendance: 18,738; Referee: Allen Chapman

October 1 31	Los Angeles FC	0–1	Real Salt Lake	Los Angeles
5:00 PM	Ilie (yellow card) 39'; Olivera (yellow card) 56'; Tillman (yellow card) 62'; Bogusz (yellow card) 67'; Palacios (yellow card) 78'	Report	Gómez (yellow card) 51'; Arango 72'; Rubin (yellow card) 86'; Palacio (yellow card) 89'	Stadium: BMO Stadium; Attendance: 22,221; Referee: Timothy Ford

October 4 32	Los Angeles FC	5–1	Minnesota United FC	Los Angeles
7:30 PM	Bouanga 6', 36', 45+1'; Tapias 46' (o.g.); Krastev 67'	Report	Dotson 4'; Reynoso (yellow card) 39'	Stadium: BMO Stadium; Attendance: 22,041; Referee: Guido Gonzales Jr.

October 7 33	Austin FC	2–4	Los Angeles FC	Austin, Texas
5:30 PM	Rigoni (yellow card) 51'; Väisänen 75'; Zardes (yellow card) 90'; Chiellini 90+4' (o.g.)	Report	Tillman 13'; Bouanga 45+1' (pen.), 54'; Olivera 68'	Stadium: Q2 Stadium; Attendance: 20,738; Referee: Jon Freemon

October 21 34	Vancouver Whitecaps FC	1–1	Los Angeles FC	Vancouver, British Columbia
6:00 PM	Ahmed 58'; Adekugbe (yellow card) 71'; Berhalter (yellow card) 76'	Report	Bouanga 34', (yellow card) 45+4'; Palacios (yellow card) 44'; Tillman (yellow card) 51'; Bogusz (yellow card) 57'; Ilie (yellow card) 69'; Chiellini (yellow card) 73'; Crépeau (yellow card) 74'	Stadium: BC Place; Attendance: 25,146; Referee: Fotis Bazakos

==== MLS Cup Playoffs ====
===== Round One =====
October 28 Game 1	Los Angeles FC	5–2	Vancouver Whitecaps FC	Los Angeles
5:00 pm PT	Hollingshead 18', 52'; Vela (yellow card) 22'; Bouanga 29', 64'; Murillo 80'	Report	White 27'; Adekugbe 40'; Brown (yellow card) 41'; Blackmon (yellow card) 55'; Vite (yellow card) 63'; Johnson (yellow card) 82'	Stadium: BMO Stadium; Attendance: 22,002; Referee: Jon Freemon

November 5 Game 2	Vancouver Whitecaps FC	0–1	Los Angeles FC	Vancouver, British Columbia
4:30 pm PT	Veselinović (yellow card) 22'; Schöpf (yellow card) 90+1'; Adekugbe (yellow card) 90+4'; Becher (yellow card) 90+4'	Report	Bouanga 24' (pen.); González (yellow card) 40'; Olivera (yellow card) 83'	Stadium: BC Place; Attendance: 30,204; Referee: Timothy Ford
Note: Los Angeles FC won the series 2–0.

===== Conference Semifinals =====
November 26	Seattle Sounders FC	0–1	Los Angeles FC	Seattle, Washington
6:30 pm PT	Nouhou (yellow card) 20'; Atencio (yellow card) 40'; João Paulo (yellow card) 66'	Report	Bouanga 30'; Crépeau (yellow card) 84'; Palacios (yellow card) 86'; Chiellini (yellow card) 90'	Stadium: Lumen Field; Attendance: 33,649; Referee: Ted Unkel

===== Conference Finals =====
December 2	Los Angeles FC	2–0	Houston Dynamo FC	Los Angeles
6:30 pm PT	Hollingshead 44'; Escobar 80' (o.g.)	Report	Escobar (yellow card) 45+3'; Herrera (yellow card) 71'	Stadium: BMO Stadium; Attendance: 22,221; Referee: Victor Rivas

===== MLS Cup 2023 =====
December 9	Columbus Crew	2–1	Los Angeles FC	Columbus, Ohio
1:00 pm PT	Hernández 33' (pen.); Yeboah 37'; Amundsen (yellow card) 61'; Rossi (yellow card) 90'; Morris (yellow card) 90+3'	Report	Vela (yellow card) 49'; Tillman (yellow card) 53'; Sánchez (yellow card) 67'; Bouanga 74'; Palacios (yellow card) 85'	Stadium: Lower.com Field; Attendance: 20,802; Referee: Armando Villarreal

=== U.S. Open Cup ===
Los Angeles FC entered the Open Cup at the Round of 32.

All matches are in Pacific Time.

May 9 Round of 32	(USLC) Monterey Bay FC (California)	2–2 (a.e.t.) (4–5 p)	(California) Los Angeles FC (MLS)	Seaside, California
7:30 PM	Murphy (yellow card) 45'; Dawkins 90'; Maldonado 94'; Siaha (yellow card) 103'; Fehr (yellow card) 110'	Report	Torres 25'; Maia 105'	Stadium: Cardinale Stadium; Attendance: 5,808; Referee: Cristian Campo
	Penalties
	Volesky (penalty scored); Dawkins (penalty scored); Greene (penalty scored); Okoli (penalty missed); Boone (penalty scored); Fehr (penalty missed)		(penalty scored) Maia; (penalty scored) Ordaz; (penalty missed) Crisostomo; (penalty scored) Moyado; (penalty scored) Jakupović; (penalty scored) Rosales

May 23 Round of 16	(MLS) Los Angeles FC (California)	0–2	(California) LA Galaxy (MLS)	Los Angeles
7:30 PM	Crisostomo (yellow card) 36'; Dueñas (yellow card) 56'; Gaines (yellow card) 76'	Report	Calegari (yellow card) 29'; Rodríguez (yellow card) 41'; Boyd 49'; Puig 52', (yellow card) 52'	Stadium: BMO Stadium; Attendance: 16,362; Referee: Allen Chapman

=== CONCACAF Champions League ===
Los Angeles FC qualified for the tournament as the 2022 Supporters' Shield winners and MLS Cup 2022 winners.

All matches are in Pacific Time.

==== Round of 16 ====
March 9 First leg	Alajuelense (Costa Rica)	0–3	(United States) Los Angeles FC	Alajuela, Costa Rica
7:00 PM	Parkins (yellow card) 34'	Report	Bouanga 47', 70', 89'; Murillo (yellow card) 87'	Stadium: Estadio Alejandro Morera Soto; Referee: Daneion Parchment (Jamaica)

March 15 Second leg	Los Angeles FC (United States)	1–2 (4–2 agg.)	(Costa Rica) Alajuelense	Los Angeles, United States
7:30 PM	Chiellini (yellow card) 7'; Vela 83'	Report	González 8', (yellow card) 51'; Gamboa (yellow card) 36'; Suárez 52'; Mora (yellow card) 73'	Stadium: BMO Stadium; Attendance: 19,672; Referee: Adonai Escobedo González (Mexico)
Note: Los Angeles FC advance 4–2 on aggregate.

==== Quarter-finals ====
April 5 First Leg	Vancouver Whitecaps FC (Canada)	0–3	(United States) Los Angeles FC	Vancouver, Canada
7:00 PM PDT		Report	Bouanga 55', 65'; Opoku 61'	Stadium: BC Place; Attendance: 11,652; Referee: Fernando Guerrero Ramírez (Mexico)

April 11 Second Leg	Los Angeles FC (United States)	3–0 (6–0 agg.)	(Canada) Vancouver Whitecaps FC	Los Angeles, United States
7:15 PDT	Vela 8' (pen.), 31'; Ilie (yellow card) 32'; Cifuentes 65'	Report	Berhalter (yellow card) 20'	Stadium: BMO Stadium; Attendance: 18,688; Referee: Juan Calderón (Costa Rica)
Note: Los Angeles FC advance 6–0 on aggregate.

==== Semi-finals ====
April 26 First Leg	Philadelphia Union (United States)	1–1	(United States) Los Angeles FC	Chester, United States
6:00 PM	Martínez (yellow card) 63'; Gazdag 86' (pen.)	Report	Acosta (yellow card) 84', (goal) 90+1'	Stadium: Subaru Park; Attendance: 17,676; Referee: César Ramos (Mexico)

May 2 Second Leg	Los Angeles FC (United States)	3–0 (4–1 agg.)	(United States) Philadelphia Union	Los Angeles, United States
7:00 PM	Tillman 13'; Bouanga (yellow card) 17', (goal) 90'; Murillo (yellow card) 43'; Opoku 82'	Report	Bedoya (yellow card) 2'; Uhre (yellow card) 37'; Mbaizo (yellow card) 41' (yellow-red card) 59'	Stadium: BMO Stadium; Attendance: 19,985; Referee: Drew Fischer (Canada)
Note: Los Angeles FC advance 4–1 on aggregate.

==== Final ====
May 31 First leg	León (Mexico)	2–1	(United States) Los Angeles FC	León, Mexico
10:00 pm (8:00 pm CDT)	Tesillo 8', (yellow card) 33'; Frías (yellow card) 43'; Mena 45+5' (pen.); Romero (yellow card) 65'	Report	Maldonado (yellow card) 45'; Hollingshead (yellow card) 45+4'; Cifuentes (yellow card) 89'; Bouanga 90+6'	Stadium: Estadio León; Attendance: 20,517; Referee: Walter López (Guatemala)

June 4 Second leg	Los Angeles FC (United States)	0–1 (1–3 agg.)	(Mexico) León	Los Angeles, United States
10:00 pm (7:00 pm PDT)	Palacios (yellow card) 19'; Ilie (yellow card) 32'; Vela (yellow card) 52'; Murillo (yellow card) 75'; Hollingshead (yellow card) 90'	Report	Barreiro (yellow card) 19'; Di Yorio 20'; Moreno (yellow card) 76'; Ambríz (yellow card) 80' Frías (yellow card) 81'	Stadium: BMO Stadium; Attendance: 22,413; Referee: Iván Barton (El Salvador)
Note: León wins the CONCACAF Champions League 3–1 on aggregate.

=== Leagues Cup ===
Los Angeles FC will enter the Leagues Cup in the Round of 32

==== Knockout round ====
August 2 Round of 32	Los Angeles FC (United States)	7–1	(Mexico) Juárez	Los Angeles
7:30 p.m. PST	Hollingshead 31'; Vela 33', 61'; Bouanga 52', 66', 78' (pen.); Maldonado (yellow card) 84'; Ordaz 90'	Report	Escoto 47'; Rodríguez (yellow card) 85'	Stadium: BMO Stadium; Attendance: 22,041; Referee: Marcos de Oliveira

August 8 Round of 16	Los Angeles FC (United States)	4–0	(United States) Real Salt Lake	Los Angeles
7:00 p.m.PST	Chiellini (yellow card) 38'; Bouanga 52', 56'; Ordaz 62'; Palencia (yellow card) 83'; Krastev 84'	Report		Stadium: BMO Stadium; Attendance: 17,728; Referee: Rubiel Vazquez

August 11 Quarterfinals	Los Angeles FC (United States)	2–3	(Mexico) Monterrey	Pasadena, California
8:00 p.m. PST	Bouanga 2' (pen.); Acosta (yellow card) 8'; Bogusz 42'; Murillo (yellow card) 90+3'	Report	Meza (yellow card) 25'; Medina (yellow card) 31'; Aguirre (yellow card) 56'; Canales 68' (pen.); Palencia 80' (o.g.); Funes Mori 88'; Cortizo (yellow card) 90+8'	Stadium: Rose Bowl; Attendance: 15,649; Referee: Héctor Said Martínez
Note: Due to a scheduled concert at BMO Stadium, Los Angeles FC hosted their quarterfinal match at the Rose Bowl.

=== Campeones Cup ===
September 27, 2023
20:00 PDT (UTC−07:00)

Los Angeles FC (United States)	0–0	(Mexico) UANL
	Report
Penalties
Bouanga (penalty scored); Tillman (penalty missed); Ilie (penalty scored); Hollingshead (penalty missed)	2–4	(penalty scored) Gignac; (penalty scored) Ibáñez; (penalty scored) Pizarro; (penalty scored) Angulo

BMO Stadium, Los Angeles, California
Attendance: 20,605
Referee: Drew Fischer (Canada)

== Statistics ==
=== Squad appearances and goals ===
As of October 7, 2023

No.	Pos	Nat	Player	Total		Major League Soccer		U.S. Open Cup		Champions League		Leagues Cup		Campeones Cup	
No.	Pos	Nat	Player	Apps	Goals	Apps	Goals	Apps	Goals	Apps	Goals	Apps	Goals	Apps	Goals
Goalkeepers
1	GK	(Switzerland) SUI	Eldin Jakupović	4	0	2	0	2	0	0	0	0	0	0	0
16	GK	(Canada) CAN	Maxime Crépeau	7	0	6	0	0	0	0	0	0	0	1	0
32	GK	(Mexico) MEX	Abraham Romero	0	0	0	0	0	0	0	0	0	0	0	0
77	GK	(United States) USA	John McCarthy	37	0	25	0	0	0	8	0	3	0	0+1	0
Defenders
2	DF	(Honduras) HON	Denil Maldonado	25	1	19+2	1	0	0	1+2	0	0+1	0	0	0
3	DF	(Colombia) COL	Jesús David Murillo	27	0	13+5	0	0	0	6+1	0	0+2	0	0	0
4	DF	(Colombia) COL	Eddie Segura	0	0	0	0	0	0	0	0	0	0	0	0
12	DF	(Ecuador) ECU	Diego Palacios	39	0	27+1	0	0	0	8	0	2	0	1	0
14	DF	(Italy) ITA	Giorgio Chiellini	26	1	16+3	1	0	0	3	0	3	0	1	0
18	DF	(United States) USA	Erik Dueñas	26	0	8+10	0	2	0	0+4	0	0+2	0	0	0
24	DF	(United States) USA	Ryan Hollingshead	42	5	24+7	4	0	0	6+1	0	3	1	1	0
28	DF	(Mexico) MEX	Tony Leone	0	0	0	0	0	0	0	0	0	0	0	0
30	DF	(Spain) ESP	Sergi Palencia	29	0	14+5	0	0	0	2+4	0	1+2	0	0+1	0
33	DF	(United States) USA	Aaron Long	32	0	17+4	0	0	0	7	0	3	0	1	0
35	DF	(Spain) ESP	Jeremi Rodríguez	1	0	0	0	1	0	0	0	0	0	0	0
36	DF	(Mexico) MEX	Javen Romero	2	0	0	0	2	0	0	0	0	0	0	0
41	DF	(United States) USA	Armando Avila	2	0	0	0	0+2	0	0	0	0	0	0	0
43	DF	(United States) USA	Diego Rosales	2	0	0	0	2	0	0	0	0	0	0	0
80	DF	(United States) USA	Julian Gaines	4	0	1+1	0	2	0	0	0	0	0	0	0
Midfielders
6	MF	(Spain) ESP	Ilie Sánchez	45	1	30+3	1	0	0	8	0	3	0	1	0
11	MF	(United States) USA	Timothy Tillman	26	5	5+11	4	0	0	5+3	1	0+1	0	0+1	0
17	MF	(Peru) PER	Daniel Crisostomo	9	0	3+3	0	2	0	0+1	0	0	0	0	0
19	MF	(Poland) POL	Mateusz Bogusz	36	4	19+8	3	1	0	2+2	0	3	1	1	0
23	MF	(United States) USA	Kellyn Acosta	34	1	18+5	0	0	0	6+1	1	3	0	1	0
34	MF	(United States) USA	Bryan Moyado	1	0	0	0	0+1	0	0	0	0	0	0	0
42	MF	(United States) USA	Christopher Jaime	2	0	0	0	1+1	0	0	0	0	0	0	0
50	MF	(Bulgaria) BUL	Filip Krastev	10	2	0+8	1	0	0	0	0	0+2	1	0	0
	MF	(United States) USA	Bajung Darboe	0	0	0	0	0	0	0	0	0	0	0	0
Forwards
7	FW	(Croatia) CRO	Stipe Biuk	43	3	13+17	3	0+1	0	1+7	0	3	0	0+1	0
9	FW	(Spain) ESP	Mario González	8	1	5+2	1	0	0	0	0	1	0	0	0
10	FW	(Mexico) MEX	Carlos Vela	43	14	22+11	9	0	0	8	3	1	2	1	0
21	FW	(Mexico) MEX	Christian Torres	2	1	0	0	1+1	1	0	0	0	0	0	0
25	FW	(Uruguay) URU	Cristian Olivera	10	2	6+3	2	0	0	0	0	0	0	1	0
27	FW	(Mexico) MEX	Nathan Ordaz	21	2	2+14	0	2	0	0	0	1+2	2	0	0
38	FW	(United States) USA	Yekeson Subah	2	0	0+1	0	0+1	0	0	0	0	0	0	0
40	FW	(Brazil) BRA	Matheus Maia	2	1	0	0	0+2	1	0	0	0	0	0	0
99	FW	(Gabon) GAB	Denis Bouanga	42	32	27+3	19	0	0	7+1	7	3	6	1	0
Players who made an appearance this season but left the club
5	DF	(Senegal) SEN	Mamadou Fall	3	0	1	0	0	0	0	0	0+2	0	0	0
35	DF	(United States) USA	Noah Dollenmayer	2	0	0	0	2	0	0	0	0	0	0	0
20	MF	(Ecuador) ECU	José Cifuentes	26	2	13+6	1	0	0	4+3	1	0	0	0	0
22	FW	(Ghana) GHA	Kwadwo Opoku	28	4	13+6	2	1	0	6+2	2	0	0	0	0
39	FW	(Mali) MLI	Ladji Mallé	1	0	0	0	0+1	0	0	0	0	0	0	0
