= Marcelo Flores =

Canadian footballer (born 2003)

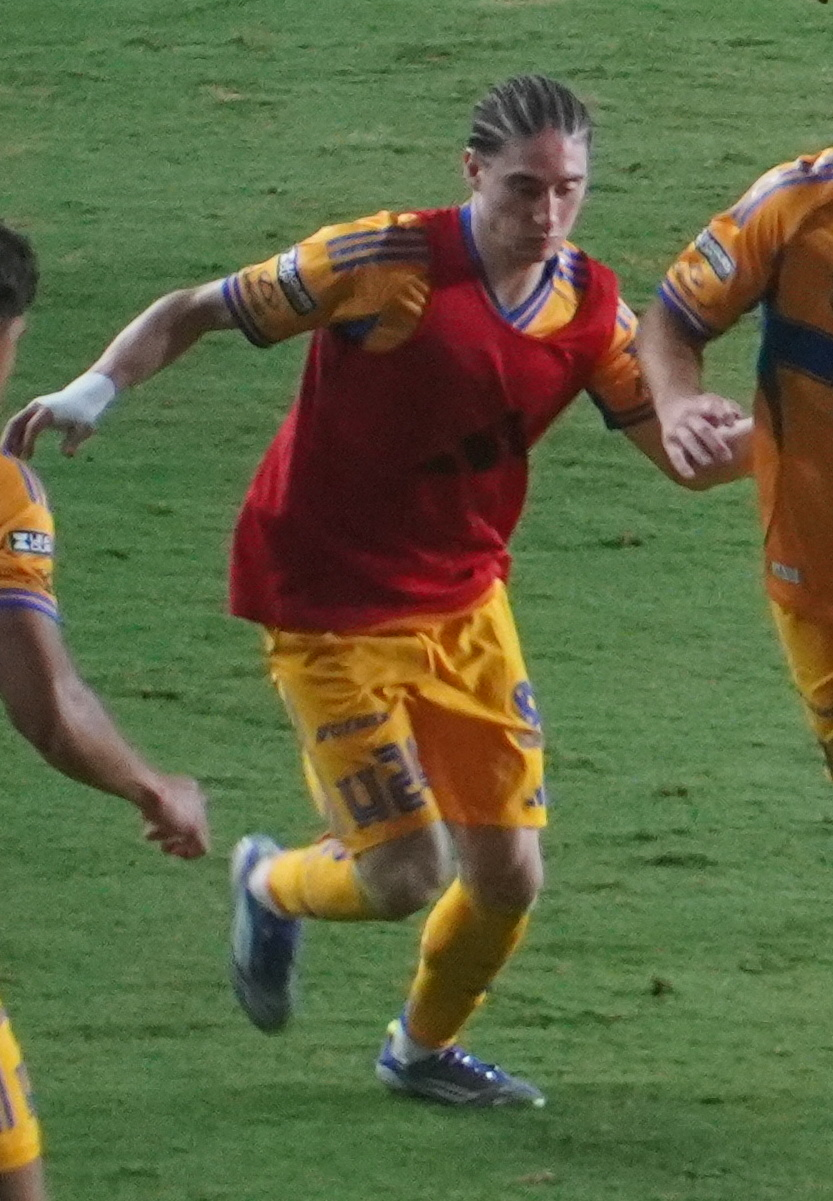
- Flores with Tigres UANL in 2025

Personal information
- Full name: Marcelo Flores Dorrell
- Date of birth: 1 October 2003 (age 23)
- Place of birth: Georgetown, Ontario, Canada
- Height: 1.64 m (5 ft 5 in)
- Positions: Attacking midfielder; winger

Team information
- Current team: Tigres UANL
- Number: 20

Youth career
- Guelph SC
- 2016–2019: Ipswich Town
- 2019–2022: Arsenal

Senior career*
Years	Team	Apps	(Gls)
2022–2023	Arsenal	0	(0)
2022–2023	→ Real Oviedo (loan)	13	(0)
2023–	Tigres UANL	71	(12)

International career^{‡}
2019	Mexico U16	5	(1)
2021	Mexico U20	6	(2)
2023–2024	Mexico U23	6	(0)
2021–2022	Mexico	3	(0)
2026–	Canada	2	(0)
Medal record
Men's soccer
Representing Canada
CONCACAF Nations League
Third place	2023 United States
Representing Mexico
Toulon Tournament
Second place	2023 France	Team
- * Club domestic league appearances and goals as of 10:31, 10 May 2026 (UTC) ‡ National team caps and goals as of 20:19, 31 March 2026 (UTC)

Marcelo Flores Dorrell (born 1 October 2003) is a Canadian professional soccer player who plays as an attacking midfielder or winger for Liga MX club Tigres UANL and the Canada national team.

== Early life ==
Flores was born in Canada to a Canadian mother of English descent and Mexican former footballer, Rubén Flores. He was raised in Georgetown, Ontario. As his father was the manager of the Cayman Islands women's national football team, Flores spent some time on the islands, where he was invited to a training camp by Ipswich Town youth development coach Steve Foley. He impressed during the week long camp, and joined the Ipswich Town academy.

In 2019, Flores joined the Arsenal academy on a free transfer. He made a bright start to the 2020–21 campaign with Arsenal's under-18s, scoring three goals in two games.

== Club career ==
=== Arsenal ===
After training with the first team, he signed his first professional contract in October 2020. Shortly after, he was included in The Guardian's "Next Generation 2020", highlighting the best young players in the world. He was called up to the Arsenal first team for the first time on 4 April 2022, making the bench for their match against Crystal Palace, although he did not appear in the match as a substitute.

==== Loan to Real Oviedo ====
On 20 July 2022, Flores joined Segunda División club Real Oviedo on a season-long loan. On 15 August, he made his professional debut in a league match against FC Andorra in a 1–0 loss, coming on as a substitute.

=== Tigres UANL ===
On 10 September 2023, Mexican club Tigres UANL reached an agreement with Arsenal to sign Flores. Seven days later, Flores made his debut with the club in a 2–0 away victory against Atlas. On 20 April 2024, Flores scored a hat-trick, all within 10 minutes, against Necaxa in a 5–2 home victory.

== International career ==
=== Mexico youth and senior ===
Flores was eligible to play for either Canada, England or Mexico. He was first called up to the England under-16 side in 2019, but decided to join up with the Mexico under-16 team that same year, playing every game at the Montaigu Tournament.

In December 2020, Flores accepted a call up to a Canada camp that would take place in January 2021, but later pulled out to remain with Arsenal. On 18 June 2021, Flores was named to Canada's provisional 60-man squad for the 2021 CONCACAF Gold Cup.

In September 2021, Flores featured for Mexico's under-20 side in a double-header against Spain. In November, Flores was called up by Luis Ernesto Pérez to participate at the 2021 Revelations Cup, scoring two goals in three appearances, where Mexico won the competition. Later that month, senior national team manager Gerardo Martino expressed the possibility of calling up Flores for the friendly match against Chile on 8 December. On 29 November, Arsenal confirmed that Flores had received his first senior call up.

Flores eventually made his senior national team debut in a friendly match against Chile, making his debut as an 83rd-minute substitute in the 2–2 draw. In May 2022, Flores committed to representing Mexico internationally, as he was still eligible to switch to representing Canada or England, having only participated in friendlies. On 11 June, he appeared in a 2022–23 CONCACAF Nations League match against Suriname. However, he was still eligible to file a one-time switch in June 2025 as he met the requirement of no more than 3 caps which were earned before the age of 21.

In 2024, he was named to Mexico's final 26-man squad for the 2024 Copa América. However, then Mexico manager Jaime Lozano did not give Flores any playing minutes which would have cap-tied him permanently.

=== Canada ===
In November 2025, Flores was called up to a camp with Canada as a training player, during a pair of international friendlies. In January 2026, he was named to the Canada senior team for a training camp and friendly against Guatemala, but ultimately he chose to not attend the camp and remained at his club.

On 11 February 2026, Flores' request to switch international allegiance to Canada was approved by FIFA. On 28 March 2026, Flores made his debut for Canada, coming on as a substitute in a friendly against Iceland. On 29 May 2026, he was one of the 26 players called up to play for Canada's squad at the 2026 FIFA World Cup. However, the next day, he injured his ACL while playing for his club team during the 2026 CONCACAF Champions Cup final, forcing him out of the World Cup squad.

== Personal life ==
Flores is the son of former Mexican player and coach Rubén Flores and also has two sisters, Silvana and Tatiana, who are also professional soccer players.

== Career statistics ==
=== Club ===
As of match played on 30 May 2026

Appearances and goals by club, season and competition
Club	Season	League			National cup (Note: Includes Copa del Rey)		Continental		Other		Total	
Club	Season	Division	Apps	Goals	Apps	Goals	Apps	Goals	Apps	Goals	Apps	Goals
Arsenal U21	2021–22	—			—		—		1 (Note: Appearance in EFL Trophy)	1	1	1
Arsenal U21	2023–24	—			—		—		1	0	1	0
Arsenal U21	Total		—		—		—		2	1	2	1
Real Oviedo (loan)	2022–23	Segunda División	13	0	2	0	—		—		15	0
Tigres UANL	2023–24	Liga MX	25	6	—		3 (Note: Appearances in CONCACAF Champions Cup)	1	1 (Note: Appearance in Campeones Cup)	0	29	7
Tigres UANL	2024–25	Liga MX	27	2	—		5	0	4 (Note: Appearances in Leagues Cup)	1	36	3
Tigres UANL	2025–26	Liga MX	19	4	—		7	0	2	0	28	4
Tigres UANL	Total		71	12	—		15	1	7	1	93	14
Career total			84	12	2	0	15	1	9	2	110	15

=== International ===
As of match played on 31 March 2026

Appearances and goals by national team and year
National team	Year	Apps	Goals
Mexico	2021	1	0
Mexico	2022	2	0
Mexico	Total	3	0
Canada	2026	2	0
Canada	Total	2	0
Career total		5	0

== Honours ==
Tigres UANL

- Campeones Cup: 2023

Mexico U20

- Revelations Cup: 2021

Mexico

- CONCACAF Nations League third place: 2022–23

Individual

- Revelations Cup Best Player: 2021
