= Maxime Crépeau =

Canadian soccer player (born 1994)

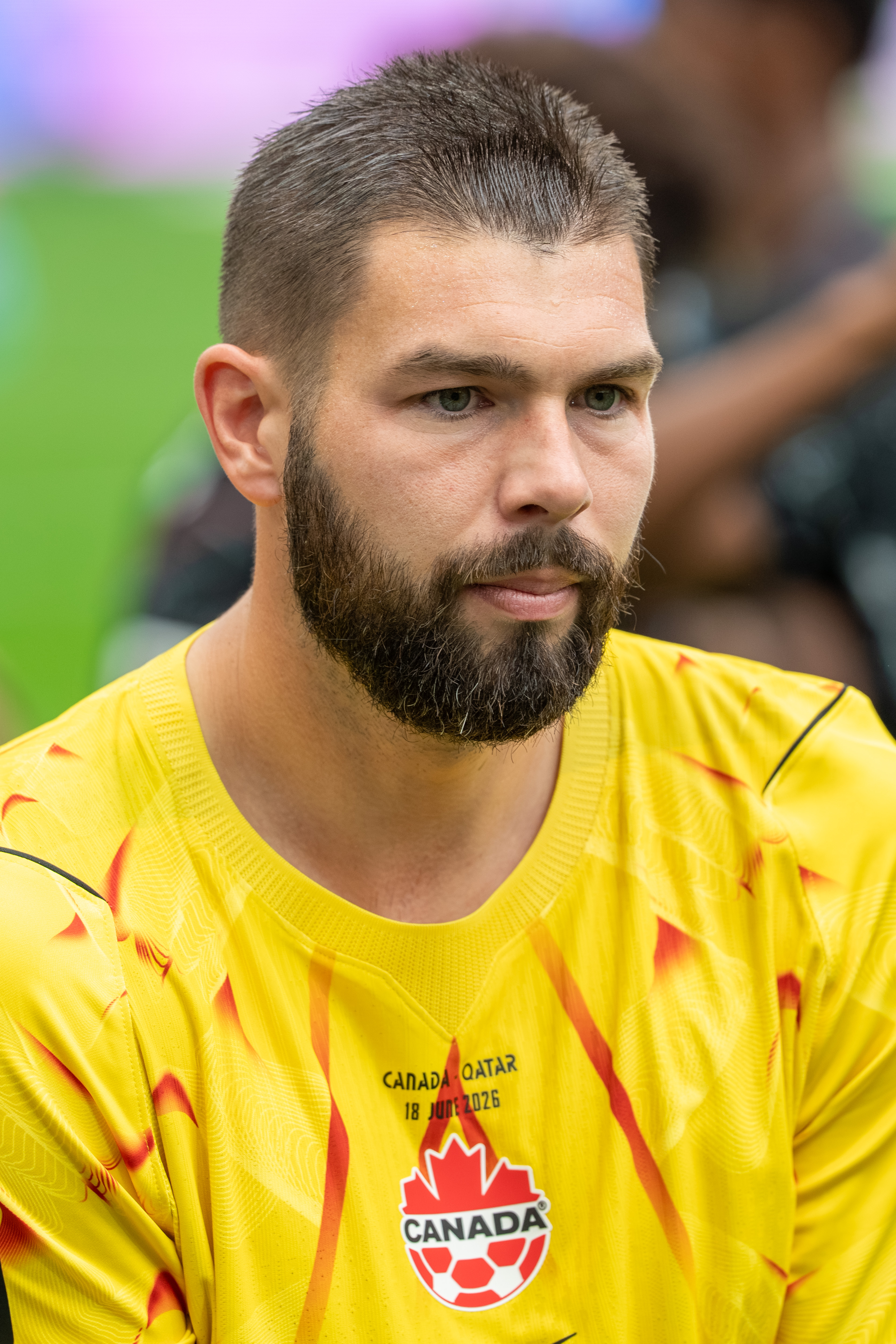
- Crépeau with Canada in 2026

Personal information
- Full name: Maxime Crépeau
- Date of birth: May 11, 1994 (age 32)
- Place of birth: Greenfield Park, Quebec, Canada
- Height: 1.81 m (5 ft 11 in)
- Position: Goalkeeper

Team information
- Current team: Orlando City
- Number: 71

Youth career
- 2008–2009: Celtix du Haut-Richelieu
- 2010–2013: Montreal Impact

Senior career*
Years	Team	Apps	(Gls)
2013–2018	Montreal Impact	3	(0)
2015–2016	→ FC Montreal (loan)	30	(0)
2018	→ Ottawa Fury (loan)	31	(0)
2019–2022	Vancouver Whitecaps	57	(0)
2022–2023	Los Angeles FC	40	(0)
2023	→ Los Angeles FC 2 (loan)	5	(0)
2024–2025	Portland Timbers	35	(0)
2026–	Orlando City	33	(0)

International career^{‡}
2011	Canada U17	6	(0)
2013	Canada U20	3	(0)
2015–2017	Canada U23	9	(0)
2016–	Canada	39	(0)
- * Club domestic league appearances and goals as of 23:38, November 7, 2026 (UTC) ‡ National team caps and goals as of 04:06, November 16, 2026 (UTC)

Maxime Crépeau (born May 11, 1994) is a Canadian professional soccer player who plays as a goalkeeper for Major League Soccer club Orlando City and the Canada national team.

Crépeau is a product of the Montreal Impact Academy, and signed with the Montreal Impact first team in 2013. Crépeau has since signed with FC Montreal and Ottawa Fury on loan, and joined the Vancouver Whitecaps, Los Angeles FC, Portland Timbers, and Orlando City on permanent contracts. With Los Angeles FC, Crépeau won the 2022 Supporters' Shield and 2022 MLS Cup.

On the international level, Crépeau played for Canada U17, Canada U20, and Canada U23 teams, before first representing the senior team in 2016. With the senior team, Crépeau has represented Canada at the 2017, 2019, 2021, and 2025 editions of the CONCACAF Gold Cup, the 2024 Copa América, and the 2026 FIFA World Cup.

== Club career ==
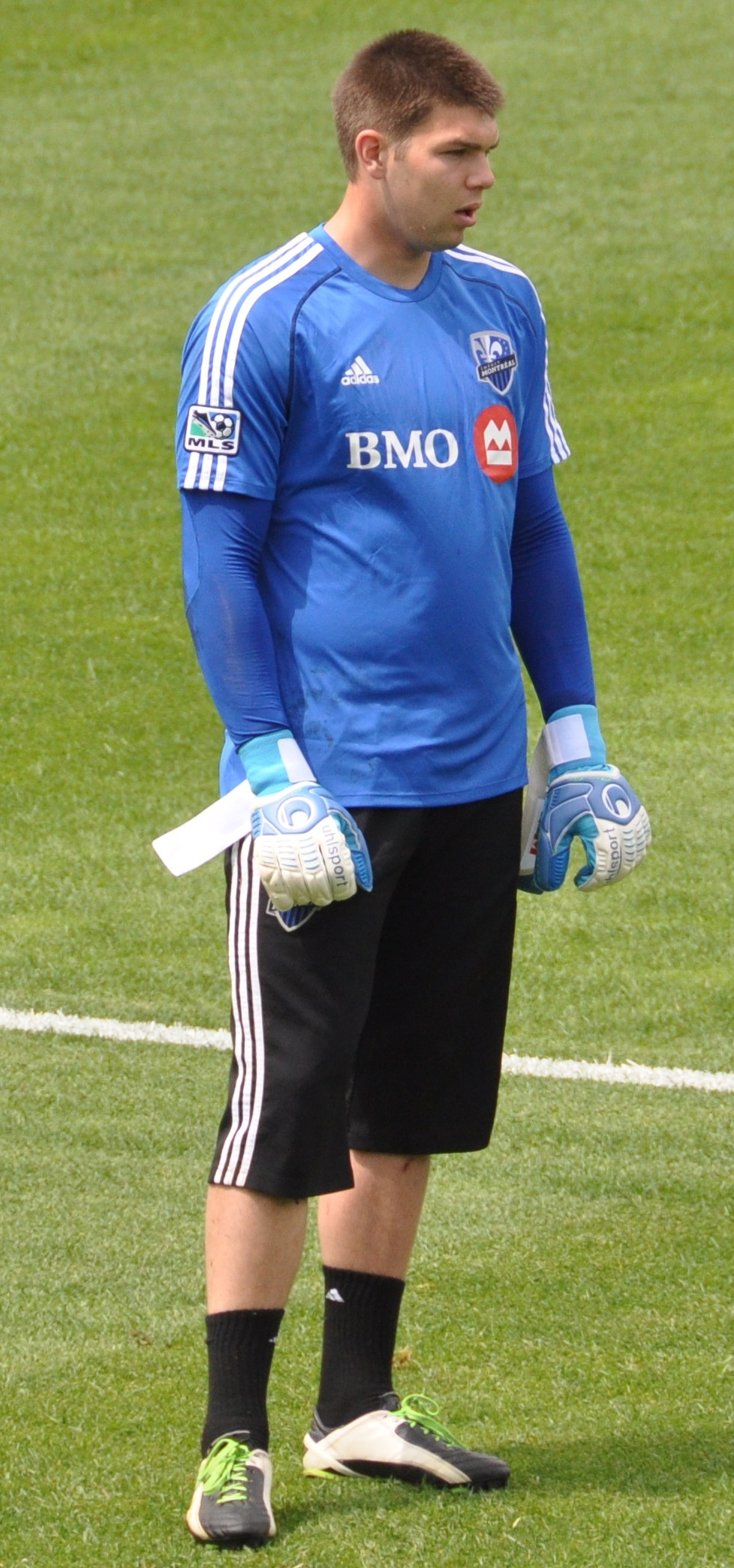
Crépeau with Montreal Impact in 2013

=== Montreal Impact ===
Crépeau joined the Montreal Impact Academy of the Canadian Soccer League in 2010. After three seasons with the U21 squad he signed a senior contract with the Montreal Impact, becoming the team's fourth homegrown player on a four-year contract. On January 5, 2015, Crépeau joined German club Fortuna Düsseldorf for a ten-day training stint before the open of Montreal's pre-season camp for the 2015 MLS season. After spending the beginning of the 2015 season with the Impact, Crépeau sat on the bench as the backup goalkeeper during the second leg of the 2015 CONCACAF Champions League Finals.

After the match, as originally planned, Crépeau was loaned to FC Montreal, the Impact's USL affiliate team, making his professional debut against the Rochester Rhinos on May 2, 2015. Crépeau would spend two seasons with FC Montreal before the club ceased operations after the 2016 season.

Prior to the 2017 season, the Impact promoted Crépeau to the backup goalkeeper position, behind Evan Bush. In May 2017, Crépeau made his first-team debut in the first leg of the 2017 Canadian Championship against Vancouver Whitecaps.

Citing a desire for more playing time in 2018, Crépeau was loaned to the Ottawa Fury of the USL for the 2018 season. After not conceding a goal in six straight games, Crépeau was named USL Player of the Month for May 2018. While playing every game for the Fury, he would consider his time with the club as a renewal, allowing him to improve on aspects of his game. By the close of the season Crépeau had set a new USL record for the most shutouts in a single season with 15, surpassing Brandon Miller who at the time was playing for the Rochester Rhinos. Crépeau would be named to the USL's All-League First Team, and would also be named USL Goalkeeper of the year. After the 2018 season, the Fury would announce that Crépeau would not return to the Fury for the 2019 season.

=== Vancouver Whitecaps ===
On December 9, 2018, Crépeau was traded to the Vancouver Whitecaps in exchange for $50,000 in Targeted Allocation Money and a third-round pick in the 2020 MLS SuperDraft. He made his debut in the Whitecaps' season opener on March 2, 2019, against Minnesota United. Crepeau took over the starting goalkeeper role with the Whitecaps in 2019 and 2020, but missed a large portion of the 2020 season due to suffering a fractured thumb in the MLS is Back Tournament. In 2019 and 2021, he was named Whitecaps' player of the year. By early 2022, he had been in 63 league and cup appearances, and 14 international appearances for Canada.

=== Los Angeles FC ===
On January 20, 2022, Crépeau was traded to Los Angeles FC for $1 million in allocation money. Concerning the reasons for the move, Whitecaps CEO Axel Schuster did not give details but cited a "very special personal situation." Crepeau called the decision "personally the hardest decision I've had to make in my professional career," and noted it was not due to health of him or his family. He joined Tomas Romero and John McCarthy at LAFC as the team keepers. He made his debut for Los Angeles on February 26 in their season-opener against the Colorado Rapids, keeping a clean-sheet in a 3–0 victory. Crépeau started all but one game for LAFC in the 2022 season, but suffered a serious leg injury while drawing a red card in extra time of the 2022 MLS Cup in an attempt to defend a Philadelphia Union breakaway caused by an errant back pass, a game from which Los Angeles would emerge victorious on penalties.

Crépeau made his return to the pitch on July 23, 2023, with MLS Next Pro side Los Angeles FC 2, starting and captaining the team to a 2–1 victory over the Tacoma Defiance.

=== Portland Timbers ===
Crépeau joined the Portland Timbers on January 17, 2024, through the 2025 season with a club option for 2026. He made his debut for Portland on March 2 against D.C. United. On July 25, 2025, Crépeau made a save on a bicycle kick shot from Kenny Nielsen in a 1–0 win at Los Angeles FC. This save would become a finalist for the 2025 Save of the Year. On November 14, the Timbers announced that he would leave the team upon the expiration of his contract.

=== Orlando City ===
Crépeau with Orlando City in 2026

On January 6, 2026, Crépeau signed with Orlando City, through the 2027–28 season. By signing with Orlando City, Crépeau joined the rival team of Inter Miami, where fellow Canadian international Dayne St. Clair had recently signed. At the time of signing, Crépeau and St. Clair were competing for the starting goalkeeper spot for Canada at the 2026 FIFA World Cup. Crépeau said the pair had not intended to sign with rival clubs when they became free agents, but it added a "bit of spice" to their rivalry. Crépeau started in Orlando City's season-opening match against the New York Red Bulls on February 21, which resulted in a 2–1 loss, but he was credited for making 11 saves, tying Mason Stajduhar's team record for the most saves in a single game. On March 7, early into Crépeau's third appearance for Orlando City, he received a red card for handling the ball outside the penalty box against New York City FC. After Crépeau's expulsion, Orlando City went on to lose 5–0, their joint-worst defeat in their history. Crépeau was later fined by the league's disciplinary committee for failing to leave the field in an appropriate amount of time after receiving the red card.

On July 8, Crépeau was named to the MLS All-Stars roster for the 2026 MLS All-Star Game which would be hosted at Bank of America Stadium in Charlotte, North Carolina, on July 29, after being selected by host club Charlotte FC's head coach, Dean Smith. Two days later, Crépeau's selection for the Goalie Wars challenge was announced, which would take place one day before the MLS All-Star Game on July 28 as part of a larger Skills Challenge event at Truist Field. On July 22, Crépeau recorded his first clean sheet of the league season in a 4–0 win at the San Jose Earthquakes, and for his performance he was named to the Team of the Matchday. During the Skills Challenge event on July 28, Crépeau defeated New York City FC's Matt Freese and Houston Dynamo 2's Pedro Cruz in order to win the Goalie Wars challenge. On October 10 against the Columbus Crew, Crépeau made 12 saves in a 3–2 win, outright breaking the team record for the most saves in a single game, a performance which would also see him named to the Team of the Matchday.

== International career ==
=== Youth teams ===
Crépeau represented Canada at the youth level, participating in the 2011 CONCACAF U-17 Championship and the subsequent FIFA U-17 World Cup later that same year. He then went on to represent Canada at the 2013 CONCACAF U-20 Championship. In August 2015 Crépeau was named to the 2015 Pan American Games roster. On September 18, 2015, he was announced as part of the 2015 CONCACAF Men's Olympic Qualifying Championship team.

In May 2016, Crepeau was called to Canada's U23 national team for a pair of friendlies against Guyana and Grenada. He started the second match against Guyana, posting a 5–1 victory.

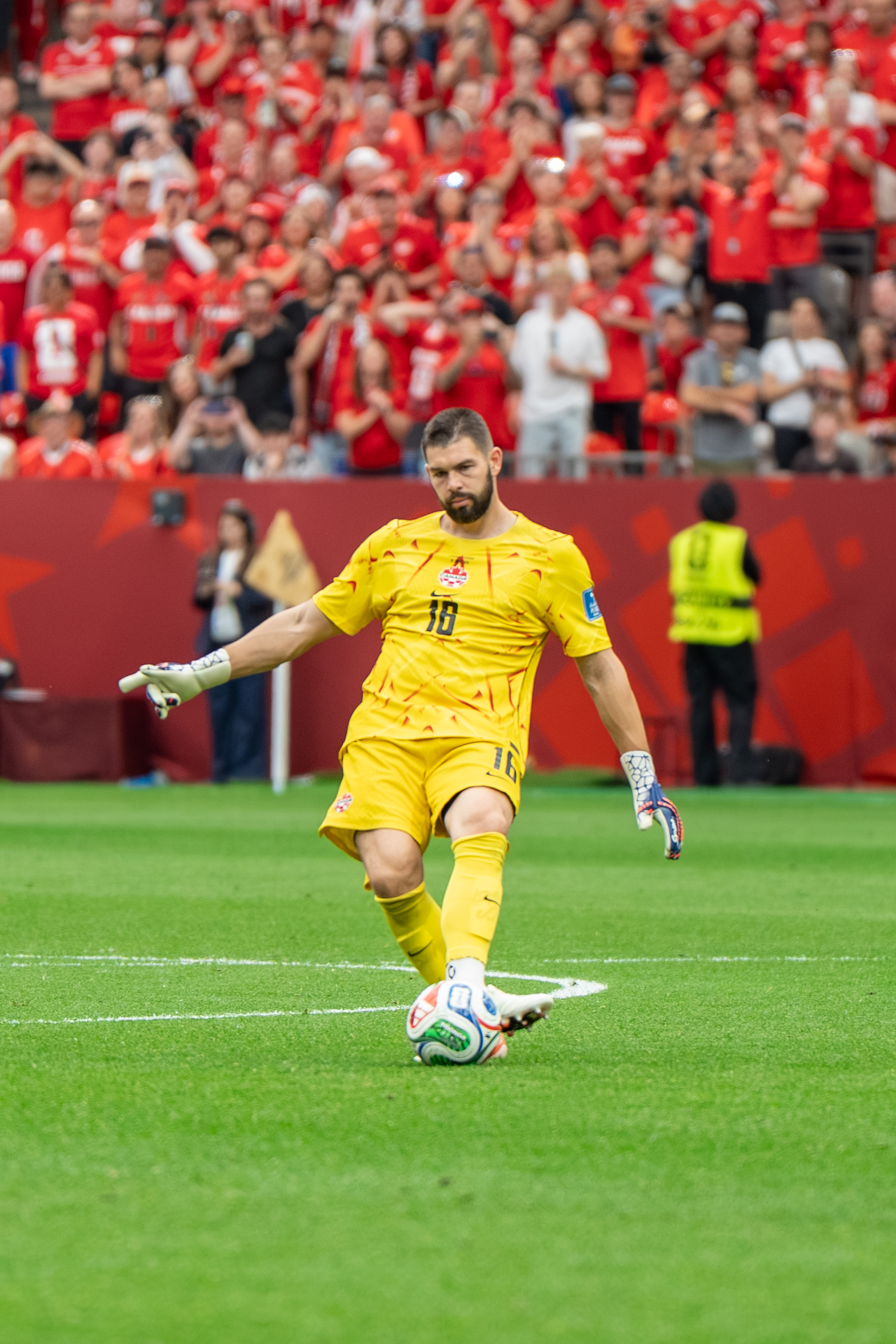
Crépeau with Canada during the 2026 FIFA World Cup

=== Senior team ===
Crépeau received his first call up to the Canadian senior team in January 2014, as part of a training camp under coach Benito Floro. He made his debut against the United States on February 2, 2016. In June 2017 Crépeau was called up to the senior team for the 2017 CONCACAF Gold Cup. He made one appearance at the tournament, replacing an injured Milan Borjan in Canada's tournament opener against French Guiana. Crépeau was named to the squad for the 2019 CONCACAF Gold Cup in May 2019, and the 2021 CONCACAF Gold Cup in July 2021. In the 2021 Gold Cup, regular Canada starter Borjan was not called up, leaving Crépeau as the first choice keeper for the tournament. He played all of Canada's matches as the team advanced all the way to the semifinals before bowing out against Mexico. It was Canada's best performance at the Gold Cup since 2007.

Crépeau was a regular call-up during the final round of qualification for the 2022 FIFA World Cup, and featured in the October 2021 window against Mexico, Jamaica, and Panama. In November 2022, he suffered a broken lower leg during the MLS Cup Final, ruling him out of the World Cup squad.

In June 2024, Crépeau was named to Canada's squad for the 2024 Copa América. In July 2025, he was named to the squad for the 2025 CONCACAF Gold Cup.

In May 2026, Crépeau was called up to Canada's 26-man squad for the 2026 FIFA World Cup. On June 4, Canada head coach Jesse Marsch announced during a press conference in Montreal that Crépeau would be the starting goalkeeper for Canada during the tournament. On June 18, during their second group stage match, Canada defeated Qatar 6–0 to secure their first ever World Cup win and clean sheet, with Crépeau not facing a shot on target the entire match. In the following group match on June 24, Canada lost to Switzerland 2–1, but advanced to the knockout stages for the first time in their history in the tournament as runners-up behind Switzerland. On July 4, Canada lost 3–0 to Morocco in the round of 16 and were eliminated from the tournament.

== Career statistics ==
=== Club ===
As of match played November 19, 2026

Appearances and goals by club, season and competition
Club	Season	League			Playoffs (Note: Includes MLS Cup playoffs)		National cup (Note: Includes Canadian Championship and U.S. Open Cup)		Continental		Other		Total	
Club	Season	Division	Apps	Goals	Apps	Goals	Apps	Goals	Apps	Goals	Apps	Goals	Apps	Goals
Montreal Impact	2015	United Soccer League	11	0	—		0	0	—		—		11	0
Montreal Impact	2016	United Soccer League	19	0	—		0	0	—		—		19	0
Montreal Impact	Total		30	0	—		0	0	—		—		30	0
Montreal Impact	2017	Major League Soccer	3	0	—		4	0	—		—		7	0
Ottawa Fury (loan)	2018	United Soccer League	31	0	—		4	0	—		—		35	0
Vancouver Whitecaps	2019	Major League Soccer	26	0	—		2	0	—		—		28	0
Vancouver Whitecaps	2020	Major League Soccer	4	0	—		0	0	—		—		4	0
Vancouver Whitecaps	2021	Major League Soccer	27	0	1	0	1	0	—		—		29	0
Vancouver Whitecaps	Total		57	0	1	0	3	0	—		—		61	0
Los Angeles FC	2022	Major League Soccer	33	0	3	0	2	0	—		0	0	38	0
Los Angeles FC	2023	Major League Soccer	7	0	5	0	0	0	0	0	1 (Note: Appearance(s) in Leagues Cup)	0	13	0
Los Angeles FC	Total		40	0	8	0	2	0	0	0	1	0	51	0
Los Angeles FC 2 (loan)	2023	MLS Next Pro	5	0	—		—		—		—		5	0
Portland Timbers	2024	Major League Soccer	20	0	0	0	0	0	—		3	0	23	0
Portland Timbers	2025	Major League Soccer	15	0	0	0	2	0	—		1	0	18	0
Portland Timbers	Total		35	0	0	0	2	0	—		4	0	41	0
Orlando City	2026	Major League Soccer	33	0	1	0	1	0	—		2	0	37	0
Career total			234	0	10	0	16	0	0	0	7	0	267	0

=== International ===
As of match played November 16, 2026

Appearances and goals by national team and year
National team	Year	Apps	Goals
Canada	2016	1	0
Canada	2017	1	0
Canada	2018	0	0
Canada	2019	0	0
Canada	2020	3	0
Canada	2021	9	0
Canada	2022	1	0
Canada	2023	0	0
Canada	2024	9	0
Canada	2025	5	0
Canada	2026	11	0
Total		39	0

== Honours ==
Los Angeles

- MLS Cup: 2022
- Supporters' Shield: 2022

Individual

- USL Goalkeeper of the Year Award: 2018
- Whitecaps FC Player of the Year Award: 2021
- MLS All-Star: 2026
