= Joshua Mancha =

Mexican footballer (born 2004)

Personal information
- Full name: Joshua Dalai Mancha García
- Date of birth: 5 October 2004 (age 22)
- Place of birth: Gómez Palacio, Durango, Mexico
- Height: 1.75 m (5 ft 9 in)
- Position: Attacking midfielder

Team information
- Current team: Santos Laguna
- Number: 15

Youth career
- 2017–2023: Santos Laguna

Senior career*
Years	Team	Apps	(Gls)
2023	Santos Laguna	2	(0)
2023–2026	Sporting Atlético	10	(10)
2026–	Santos Laguna	3	(0)

International career^{‡}
2021–2022	Mexico U20	3	(1)
- * Club domestic league appearances and goals as of 1 November 2026 ‡ National team caps and goals as of 22 January 2023

Joshua Dalai Mancha García (born 5 October 2004) is a Mexican footballer who plays as an attacking midfielder for Liga MX club Santos Laguna.

== Club career ==
Mancha began his career in the Santos Laguna academy in 2017 in the U13 team. Throughout the years, he progressed through Santos' youth teams, winning the 2021 U20 Apertura title while being the tournament's top scorer and on 8 January 2023, he made his professional debut in a 0–3 loss to UANL where he was subbed in at the 81st minute. After that, he joined Sporting Atlético, where he played for three years and on 2 June 2026, he returned to Santos Laguna.

== International career ==
Mancha was called up to the under-20 team by Luis Ernesto Pérez to participate at the 2021 Revelations Cup, where Mexico won the competition. He was called up again to the Mexico U20 team this time by Adrián Sánchez to participate at the 2022 Revelations Cup, scoring one goal in three appearances, where Mexico won the competition.

== Career statistics ==
=== Club ===
As of 1 November 2026

Club	Season	League			Cup		Continental		Other		Total	
Club	Season	Division	Apps	Goals	Apps	Goals	Apps	Goals	Apps	Goals	Apps	Goals
Santos Laguna	2022–23	Liga MX	2	0	2 (Note: Appearances in Copa Sky por México)	0	—		—		4	0
Sporting Atlético	2023–24	Tercera Federación – Group 2	2	2	—		—		—		2	2
Sporting Atlético	2024–25	Tercera Federación – Group 2	4	3	—		—		—		4	3
Sporting Atlético	2025–26	Tercera Federación – Group 2	4	5	—		—		—		4	5
Sporting Atlético	Total		10	10	—		—		—		10	10
Santos Laguna	2026–27	Liga MX	3	0	—		—		1 (Note: Appearances in Leagues Cup)	0	4	0
Career total			15	10	2	0	0	0	1	0	18	10

== Honours ==
Mexico U20

- Revelations Cup: 2021, 2022

Individual

- Revelations Cup Best Player: 2022
