= Saúl Zamora =

Mexican footballer (born 2003)

Personal information
- Full name: Saúl Zamora Romero
- Date of birth: 26 March 2003 (age 23)
- Place of birth: León, Guanajuato, Mexico
- Height: 1.72 m (5 ft 8 in)
- Position: Midfielder

Team information
- Current team: Tapatío
- Number: 44

Youth career
- 2015–2023: León

Senior career*
Years	Team	Apps	(Gls)
2020	León	2	(0)
2023–	Tapatío	94	(8)
2025–	Guadalajara	1	(0)

International career^{‡}
2019	Mexico U16	5	(0)
2019	Mexico U17	1	(0)
2021–2022	Mexico U20	8	(1)
- * Club domestic league appearances and goals as of 31 October 2026 ‡ National team caps and goals as of 27 September 2022

Saúl Zamora Romero (born 26 March 2003) is a Mexican professional footballer who plays as a midfielder for Liga de Expansión MX club Tapatío.

== International career ==
Zamora was called up to the under-20 team by Luis Ernesto Pérez to participate at the 2021 Revelations Cup, appearing in one match, where Mexico won the competition. In June 2022, he was included in the under-20 squad, this time for the CONCACAF Under-20 Championship.

== Career statistics ==
=== Club ===
As of match played on 31 October 2026

Club	Season	League			Cup		Continental		Other		Total	
Club	Season	Division	Apps	Goals	Apps	Goals	Apps	Goals	Apps	Goals	Apps	Goals
León	2019–20	Liga MX	2	0	—		1 (Note: Appearances in CONCACAF Champions League)	0	—		3	0
Guadalajara	2024–25	Liga MX	1	0	—		—		—		1	0
Tapatío	2023–24	Liga de Expansión MX	31	2	—		—		—		31	2
Tapatío	2024–25	Liga de Expansión MX	21	4	—		2	0	—		21	4
Tapatío	2025–26	Liga de Expansión MX	29	2	—		—		—		29	2
Tapatío	2026–27	Liga de Expansión MX	13	0	—		—		—		13	0
Tapatío	Total		94	8	—		2	0	—		94	8
Career total			97	8	0	0	3	0	0	0	100	8

== Honours ==
León

- Leagues Cup: 2021

Mexico U20

- Revelations Cup: 2021, 2022
