= Christian Torres (footballer, born 2004) =

Professional footballer

Personal information
- Full name: Christian Dominick Torres Palacios
- Date of birth: April 15, 2004 (age 22)
- Place of birth: Fontana, California, United States
- Height: 5 ft 10 in (1.78 m)
- Position: Winger

Team information
- Current team: Loudoun United (on loan from Tapatío)
- Number: 22

Youth career
- 2016–2018: LA Galaxy
- 2018–2020: Los Angeles FC

Senior career*
Years	Team	Apps	(Gls)
2020–2023	Los Angeles FC	8	(1)
2021–2022	→ Las Vegas Lights (loan)	45	(4)
2023	Los Angeles FC 2	20	(2)
2024–	Tapatío	26	(1)
2026–	→ Loudoun United (loan)	15	(2)

International career^{‡}
2019	United States U15	5	(0)
2021–2022	Mexico U20	14	(3)
- * Club domestic league appearances and goals as of November 7, 2026 ‡ National team caps and goals as of September 27, 2022

Christian Dominick Torres Palacios (born April 15, 2004) is a professional footballer who plays as a winger for USL Championship club Loudoun United, on loan from Liga de Expansión MX club Tapatío. Born in the United States, he played for the Mexico national under-20 team.

== Club career ==
Born in Fontana, California, Torres began his career with the LA Galaxy youth academy before joining rivals Los Angeles FC in 2018. During his first season with the club, Torres won the Golden Boot for the under-15's level, scoring 17 goals.

=== Los Angeles FC ===
On July 8, 2020, Torres signed a professional homegrown player contract with Major League Soccer side Los Angeles FC. He was signed alongside fellow Mexican-American teammates Erik Dueñas and Tony Leone and all three were the first three homegrown signings to come directly from the club's academy. Torres then made his competitive debut for the club on August 30, 2020, in a 3–1 defeat against Seattle Sounders FC. He came on as a 78th-minute substitute for Brian Rodríguez. Torres made his first start on October 14, 2020, in a 2–1 loss to Vancouver Whitecaps FC. His first professional goal came on October 18, 2020, in the 93rd minute for a 1–1 draw against the Portland Timbers. On November 24, 2020, Torres became the youngest player in MLS history to start in a playoff game at the age of 16 years 223 days. The previous record holder was Jozy Altidore, then of the New York Red Bulls, at the age of 16 years 349 days.

== International career ==
Torres was called up to the Mexico U-20 team by Luis Ernesto Pérez to participate at the 2021 Revelations Cup, appearing in three matches, where Mexico won the competition. In June 2022, he was named into the final 20-man roster for the CONCACAF Under-20 Championship, in which Mexico failed to qualify for the FIFA U-20 World Cup and Olympics.

== Career statistics ==
=== Club ===
As of match played October 8, 2023

Appearances and goals by club, season and competition
Club	Season	League			National cup		Continental		Other		Total	
Club	Season	Division	Apps	Goals	Apps	Goals	Apps	Goals	Apps	Goals	Apps	Goals
Los Angeles FC	2020	MLS	8	1	—		—		1 (Note: Appearance in MLS Cup Playoffs)	0	9	1
Los Angeles FC	2023	MLS	—		2	1	—		—		2	1
Los Angeles FC	Total		8	1	2	1	0	0	1	0	11	2
Las Vegas Lights (loan)	2021	USL	25	3	–		–		–		25	3
Las Vegas Lights (loan)	2022	USL	20	1	–		–		–		20	1
Las Vegas Lights (loan)	Total		45	4	–		–		–		45	4
Los Angeles FC 2	2023	MLS Next Pro	20	2	–		–		–		20	2
Career total			73	7	2	1	0	0	1	0	76	8

== Honours ==
Mexico U20

- Revelations Cup: 2021, 2022
