= Tony Leone (footballer) =

Professional footballer (born 2004)

Personal information
- Full name: Antonio Jeremiah Leone Larios
- Date of birth: April 28, 2004 (age 22)
- Place of birth: Long Beach, California, United States
- Height: 6 ft 1 in (1.85 m)
- Position: Centre-back

Team information
- Current team: Pumas (on loan from Monterrey)
- Number: 24

Youth career
- 2016–2017: Total Futbol Academy
- 2017–2020: Los Angeles FC

Senior career*
| Years | Team | Apps | (Gls) |
| 2020–2023 | Los Angeles FC | 0 | (0) |
| 2021–2022 | → Las Vegas Lights (loan) | 43 | (2) |
| 2023 | Los Angeles FC 2 | 10 | (0) |
| 2024– | Monterrey | 6 | (0) |
| 2026– | → Pumas (loan) | 14 | (0) |

International career^{‡}
| 2019 | United States U15 | 10 | (0) |
| 2019 | Mexico U15 | 5 | (0) |
| 2020 | United States U17 | 3 | (0) |
| 2021 | Mexico U19 | 4 | (0) |
| 2021–2022 | Mexico U20 | 11 | (2) |
| 2023– | Mexico U23 | 5 | (0) |
Medal record
Men's football
Representing Mexico
Pan American Games
| Bronze medal – third place | 2023 Santiago | Team |
- * Club domestic league appearances and goals as of October 21, 2026 ‡ National team caps and goals as of November 4, 2023

Antonio Jeremiah "Tony" Leone Larios (born April 28, 2004) is a professional footballer who plays as a centre-back for Liga MX club Pumas, on loan from Monterrey. Born in the United States, he plays for the Mexico national under-23 team.

== Club career ==
Born in Long Beach, California, Leone began his career with Total Futbol Academy before joining the youth setup of Major League Soccer club Los Angeles FC. Leone rose through the ranks of the club before signing a professional homegrown player contract alongside fellow Mexican-American teammates Christian Torres and Erik Dueñas on July 8, 2020.

=== Loan to Las Vegas Lights ===
On May 22, 2021, Leone was loaned out to Los Angeles FC's USL Championship affiliate Las Vegas Lights for their match against Phoenix Rising. He made his debut in the match, starting for Las Vegas in the 1–5 defeat.

== International career ==
Leone is eligible to play for the United States or Mexico. He has represented the United States at both the under-15 and under-17 levels, and Mexico at the under-15, under-17, under-19 and under-20.

Leone was called up to the Mexico U-20 team by Luis Ernesto Pérez to participate at the 2021 Revelations Cup, appearing in three matches, where Mexico won the competition. The following year, he was subsequently called up again to the Mexico U-20 team for the 2022 CONCACAF U-20 Championship, in which Mexico failed to qualify for the FIFA U-20 World Cup and Olympics.

== Career statistics ==
=== Club ===
As of match played on October 21, 2026

Appearances and goals by club, season and competition
| Club | Season | League | | | Cup | | Continental | | Other | | Total | |
| Club | Season | Division | Apps | Goals | Apps | Goals | Apps | Goals | Apps | Goals | Apps | Goals |
|---|---|---|---|---|---|---|---|---|---|---|---|---|
| Los Angeles FC | 2020 | MLS | 0 | 0 | — | | — | | — | | 0 | 0 |
| Las Vegas Lights (loan) | 2021 | USL | 23 | 1 | — | | — | | — | | 23 | 1 |
| Las Vegas Lights (loan) | 2022 | USL | 20 | 1 | — | | — | | — | | 20 | 1 |
| Las Vegas Lights (loan) | Total | | 43 | 2 | — | | — | | — | | 43 | 2 |
| Los Angeles FC 2 | 2023 | MLS Next Pro | 10 | 0 | — | | — | | — | | 10 | 0 |
| Monterrey | 2023–24 | Liga MX | 1 | 0 | — | | 3 (Note: Appearance in CONCACAF Champions League) | 0 | — | | 4 | 0 |
| Monterrey | 2024–25 | Liga MX | 3 | 0 | — | | — | | — | | 3 | 0 |
| Monterrey | 2025–26 | Liga MX | 2 | 0 | — | | — | | 1 (Note: Appearances in Leagues Cup) | 0 | 3 | 0 |
| Monterrey | Total | | 6 | 0 | — | | 3 | 0 | 1 | 0 | 10 | 0 |
| Pumas (loan) | 2025–26 | Liga MX | 8 | 0 | — | | 1 | 0 | — | | 9 | 0 |
| Pumas (loan) | 2026–27 | Liga MX | 6 | 0 | — | | — | | 2 | 0 | 8 | 0 |
| Pumas (loan) | Total | | 14 | 0 | — | | 1 | 0 | 2 | 0 | 17 | 0 |
| Career total | | | 73 | 2 | 0 | 0 | 4 | 0 | 3 | 0 | 79 | 2 |

== Honours ==
Mexico U20

- Revelations Cup: 2021

Mexico U23

- Pan American Bronze Medal: 2023

Individual

- CONCACAF U-20 Championship Best XI: 2022
- IFFHS CONCACAF Youth (U20) Best XI: 2022
