= MLS Cup 2022 =

2022 edition of the MLS Cup

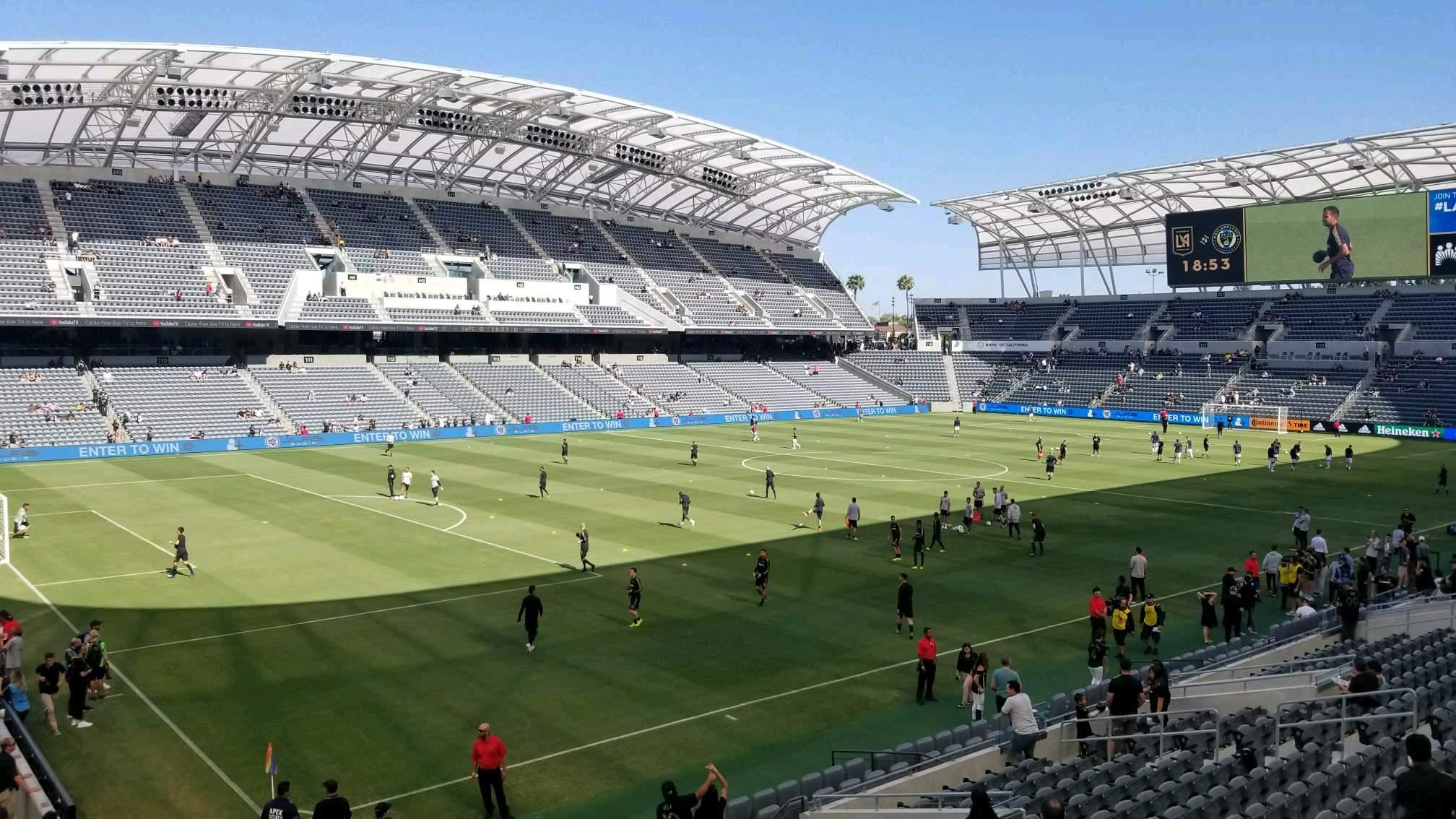
- Banc of California Stadium in Los Angeles, the host venue for MLS Cup 2022
- Event: MLS Cup
| Los Angeles FC | Philadelphia Union |
| 3 | 3 |
- After extra time Los Angeles FC won 3–0 on penalties
- Date: November 5, 2022
- Venue: Banc of California Stadium, Los Angeles, California, U.S.
- MLS Cup MVP: John McCarthy (Los Angeles FC)
- Referee: Ismail Elfath
- Attendance: 22,384
- Weather: Sunny, 71 °F (22 °C)

MLS Cup 2022 was the 27th edition of the MLS Cup, the championship match of Major League Soccer (MLS) at the conclusion of the 2022 MLS Cup Playoffs. The soccer match took place on November 5, 2022, at Banc of California Stadium in Los Angeles, California, United States. It was contested by hosts Los Angeles FC from the Western Conference and the Philadelphia Union of the Eastern Conference to determine the champion of the 2022 season. Both clubs finished the regular season atop their respective conference standings with the same number of points, but LAFC won the Supporters' Shield with the wins tiebreaker.

Los Angeles FC won their first MLS Cup title in a penalty shootout following a 3–3 draw in extra time. The score matched the record for the highest-scoring final in MLS Cup history and included the two latest goals to be scored in an MLS Cup Playoffs match, which Jack Elliott and Gareth Bale scored in stoppage time. The shootout ended in a 3–0 shutout for LAFC and their substitute goalkeeper John McCarthy, who made two saves in the shootout and was named the most valuable player (MVP) of the match.

The match was played at Banc of California Stadium, a soccer-specific stadium owned by Los Angeles FC, and had 22,384 spectators. It was broadcast in the United States on Fox Sports in English and both Univision and TUDN in Spanish. These broadcasts drew a combined 2.16 million viewers, the second-highest television audience in MLS Cup history. LAFC became the eighth team in MLS to win a domestic double and qualified for the 2023 CONCACAF Champions League, where they finished as runners-up.

== Road to the final ==
The MLS Cup is the post-season championship of Major League Soccer (MLS), a professional club soccer league in the United States and Canada. The 2022 season was the 27th in MLS history, and was contested by 28 teams organized into the eastern and western conferences. Each team played 34 matches during the regular season, which runs from late February to early October, twice against each intra-conference opponent and eight times for inter-conference opposition in an unbalanced schedule. The schedule was adjusted due to the 2022 FIFA World Cup, which began in late November 2022. The seven clubs in each conference with the most points qualify for the MLS Cup Playoffs, which is played over four rounds from October to early November. Each round had a single-elimination match that was hosted by the higher-seeded team; the top team in each conference was also given a bye to the Conference Semifinals.

Both of the finalists, Los Angeles FC (LAFC) and the Philadelphia Union, were appearing in their first MLS Cup final and finished atop their conference standings in the regular season. The teams were tied on points and the Supporters' Shield was decided by the first tiebreaker, the total number of wins; LAFC had two more wins than Philadelphia. The two teams played each other once during the regular season, ending in a 2–2 draw in early May at Banc of California Stadium in Los Angeles; it was the third consecutive draw between the two teams since 2019. LAFC was characterized as having a "star-studded" lineup relying on international talent while the Union was a "blue-collar alternative" side that relied on data-based, cost-effective signings and homegrown players.

MLS Cup 2022 was the fourth final to be contested between the top seeds from each conference and the first since the 2003 final, which was also played in the Los Angeles area; it was also the fourth between two first-time finalists. The final was the first since 2014 to not feature either Seattle Sounders FC or Portland Timbers representing the Western Conference.

=== Los Angeles FC ===
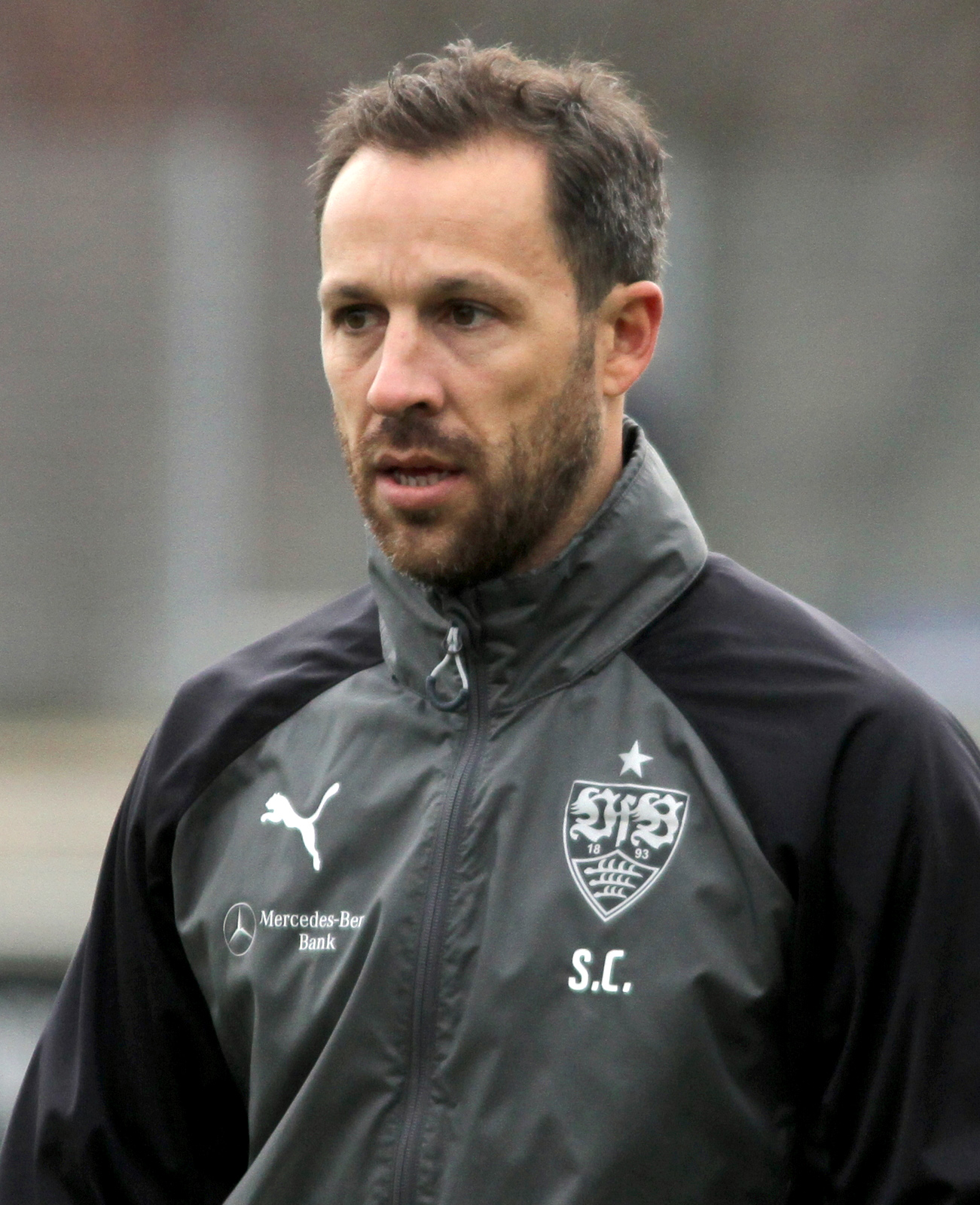
Los Angeles FC hired head coach Steve Cherundolo (pictured in 2018) prior to the 2022 season.

Los Angeles FC entered MLS in 2018 as an expansion team, becoming the third club based in the Los Angeles area following the folding of Chivas USA a few years prior. Under head coach Bob Bradley, LAFC won the Supporters' Shield in 2019 and broke the regular season points record. They advanced in the playoffs to the Conference Final but were eliminated by eventual MLS Cup champions Seattle Sounders FC. LAFC finished seventh in the West and qualified for the playoffs during the following season, which was shortened due to the COVID-19 pandemic. In the first round, Seattle again defeated LAFC. LAFC also finished as runners-up in the 2020 CONCACAF Champions League and missed the playoffs in 2021.

In January 2022, Steve Cherundolo, former assistant coach and manager of LAFC's affiliate team Las Vegas Lights FC, was hired to replace Bradley as head coach. Fans criticized the move, citing Cherundolo's inexperience in MLS and his coaching record at Las Vegas, where he won six of thirty-two matches. During the offseason, LAFC traded with other MLS clubs to acquire new players, including defender Ryan Hollingshead from FC Dallas for Marco Farfan; defender Franco Escobar from Atlanta United FC and midfielder Kellyn Acosta from Colorado Rapids, both for general allocation money; and forward Ilie Sánchez from free agency. LAFC also traded with Vancouver Whitecaps FC for goalkeeper Maxime Crépeau, who joined his former manager (now assistant coach) Marc Dos Santos and free agent signing John McCarthy as his backup to replace three young goalkeepers who had played in 2021.

LAFC were undefeated in their opening five matches but lost to crosstown rival LA Galaxy in the year's first El Tráfico derby. LAFC took first place in the Western Conference during the streak and kept a narrow lead over Austin FC and LA Galaxy, including a run of eight matches in twenty-eight days through April and May. By the mid-point of the season in late June, LAFC had amassed an 11–3–3 record and were five points ahead of Austin in the Western Conference standings, and had a five-match unbeaten streak that ended with a loss to Vancouver. LAFC made several major signings from European leagues during the summer transfer window, beginning with winger Gareth Bale from Real Madrid and Italian defender Giorgio Chiellini, both of whom joined LAFC in July, having been acquired without transfer fees, and were signed to contracts that fell below the threshold for Designated Players.

With their new signings, LAFC went on a seven-match winning streak that lasted into August and outscored opponents 19–5; Bale scored two goals as a substitute. During the streak, the club widened their leads over the Union and Austin atop the league standings and were on course to match the 2021 points record set by the New England Revolution. In August, LAFC transferred former Designated Players Brian Rodríguez and Diego Rossi to foreign clubs to free up cap space to sign Spanish midfielder Cristian Tello and Gabonese striker Dénis Bouanga. These moves completed a summer transfer window in which the club spent $10 million and brought its payroll above $19 million. The team qualified for a playoffs berth on August 20, setting a record for earliest playoffs clinch at 25 matches, but LAFC won only one of their six following matches while playing several teams on the road. LAFC briefly slid to second in the Supporters' Shield race behind the Union in mid-September but retook the lead and won their second Shield on the penultimate matchday of the season in Portland. Through the regular season, Cherundolo used 32 different starting lineups and had difficulty integrating Bale, who did not play a full match and appeared 12 times.

As the top seed in the Western Conference, LAFC earned a bye directly to the Conference Semifinals, where they hosted rival LA Galaxy. A goal by Bouanga, who received a through ball in the penalty area from captain Carlos Vela, opened the scoring for LAFC in the 23rd minute. The Galaxy equalized just before halftime through a misplayed header by Eddie Segura that Samuel Grandsir converted. Bouanga's second goal of the match, a tap-in from a ground cross sent by Ryan Hollingshead in the 80th minute, restored LAFC's lead for five minutes until a strike by Galaxy substitute Dejan Joveljić from outside the penalty area. LAFC won the match 3–2 with a goal in stoppage time by Cristian Arango, who converted a rebounded shot by Bouanga that Jonathan Bond had saved.

LAFC advanced to play second-seeded Austin FC, who had twice defeated LAFC in the regular season, in the Western Conference Final at Banc of California Stadium. The match's first goal was scored in the 29th minute by Arango, who headed in a corner kick taken by Vela, but Austin goalkeeper Brad Stuver's seven saves kept the score at 1–0 into the second half. A Vela corner kick in the 62nd minute was headed in for an own goal by Maximiliano Urruti, who had just entered the match as a substitute. A few minutes later, Sebastien Ibeagha stepped on the foot of Austin FC's Diego Fagúndez in the penalty area but a penalty kick was not awarded following a video assistant referee review. Kwadwo Opoku scored a third goal for LAFC in the 81st minute by collecting an Austin clearance that bounced to him at the top of the penalty area. Bouanga struck in the fifth minute of stoppage time but his goal was ruled out after Opoku was deemed to be in an offside position during the play, leaving LAFC with a 3–0 victory. LAFC were the first Supporters' Shield winner since Toronto FC in 2017 to earn a place in the MLS Cup final.

=== Philadelphia Union ===
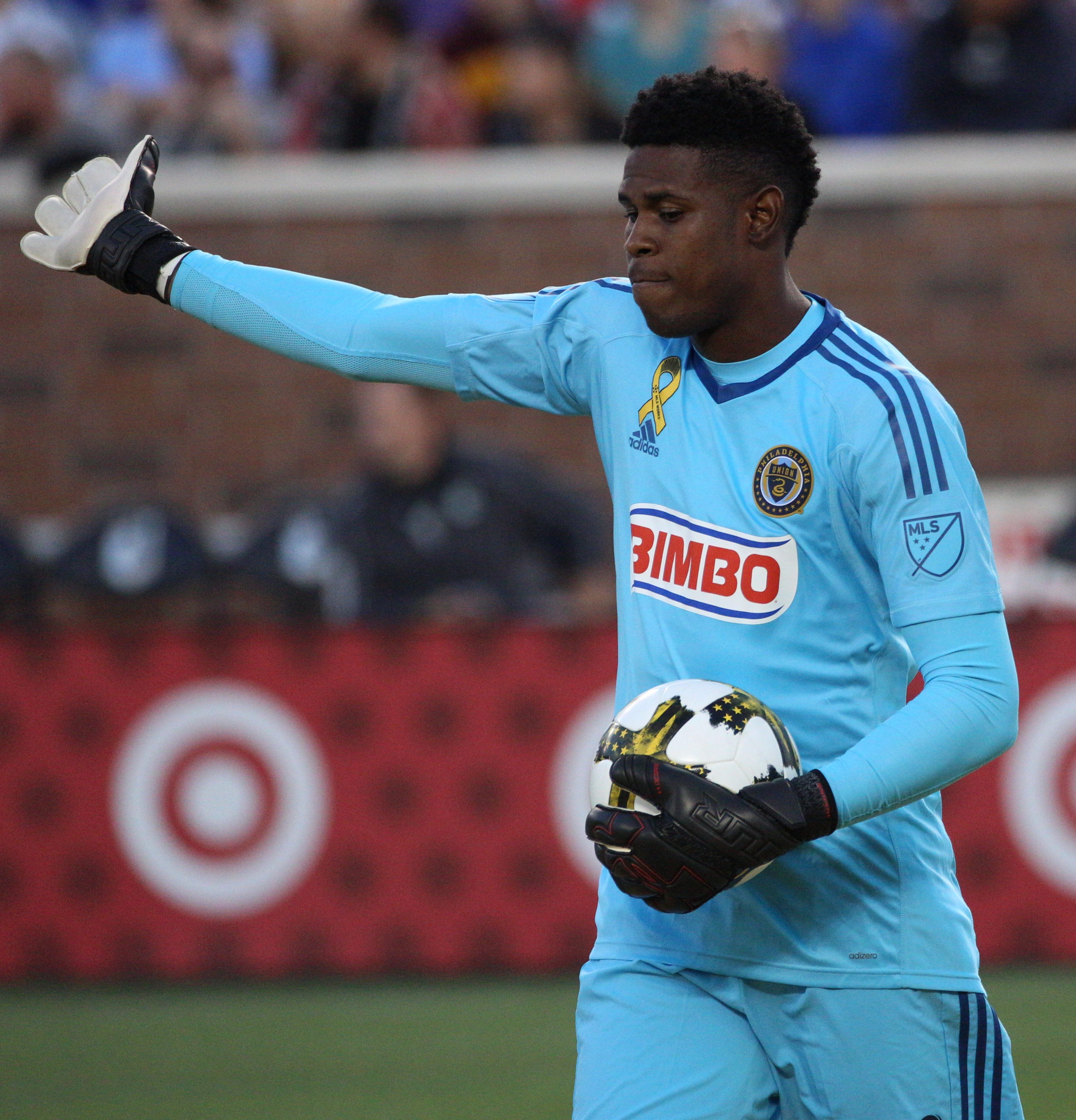
Andre Blake (pictured in 2017) earned his third Goalkeeper of the Year Award with Philadelphia in 2022.

The Philadelphia Union entered MLS as an expansion team in 2010 and earned their first playoffs berth in their second season but were eliminated in the Conference Semifinals. The club failed to qualify for the playoffs in the following four seasons but returned in 2016 under head coach Jim Curtin, their third manager in three years. The side also finished as runners-up in the U.S. Open Cup three times, most recently in 2018. The Union won their first playoff match in 2019—their fourth postseason appearance—and advanced to the Conference Semifinals, where they lost to Atlanta United FC. The club earned the Supporters' Shield, their first trophy, during the shortened 2020 season and opened the playoffs against the eighth-seeded New England Revolution, who defeated the Union in an upset.

In 2021, the Union finished second in the Eastern Conference and advanced to the Conference Finals, where they were eliminated by eventual champions New York City FC after 11 players were ruled ineligible to play due to COVID-19 quarantine restrictions. The Union retained most of their players and steadily added more attacking players through the 2021 season and the subsequent offseason, signing midfielder Dániel Gazdag from Budapest Honvéd in Hungary, forward Julián Carranza on loan from Inter Miami CF, and Mikael Uhre from Brøndby IF in Denmark; Uhre's transfer set a club record with its $2.8 million fee. The Union also traded leading goalscorer Kacper Przybylko and midfielder Jamiro Monteiro to other MLS clubs, and sought lower-priced players from overseas to supplement homegrown players as replacements.

The Union opened the 2022 season with a draw against Minnesota United FC and five consecutive wins, mostly against Eastern Conference opponents, to take the lead in league standings. The team's success was attributed to a strong defense and performances from goalkeeper Andre Blake to compensate for a lack of goals scored. Following a loss to Toronto FC that ended the winning streak, the club drew seven of eight matches as they found difficulty retaining leads. The Union remained first in the East and ended the streak with a 2–1 home win against New York City FC that was decided with a Cory Burke goal in stoppage time.

On July 8, the Union won 7–0 in a match against D.C. United, setting a new club record for margin of victory and equaling the league record. The club won their following four matches, including a 6–0 victory against Houston Dynamo FC, which brought them to second in the league standings and three points behind LAFC. The Union sent Blake and defenders Kai Wagner and Jakob Glesnes to the MLS All-Star Game and finished August with four wins and two losses, including back-to-back 6–0 wins over D.C. United and the Colorado Rapids. The club clinched a playoff berth with their final win in August and remained in contention for the Supporters' Shield until a 4–0 loss to expansion team Charlotte FC in the penultimate week of the season. The Union won 4–0 in their regular season finale against Toronto FC at home and tied LAFC on points in the Supporters' Shield contest, but lost on the wins tiebreaker.

The Union finished the regular season with the league's best goal difference (+46), the fewest goals conceded in a 34-match season in MLS history (26), and an unbeaten record at home with the most goals scored (49), equaling the league record. For the club's regular season performances, Jim Curtin won the Sigi Schmid Coach of the Year Award for the second time, Blake won his third MLS Goalkeeper of the Year Award, and Glesnes was named the Defender of the Year. Four players—Blake, Glesnes, Wagner, and Gazdag—were named to the MLS Best XI and tied the record for second-most entries from a single team in league history. The Union entered the playoffs in the Conference Semifinals, where they hosted fifth-place FC Cincinnati, who were in the playoffs for the first time. Leon Flach scored the match's only goal in the 59th minute during a scramble in the penalty area as the Union advanced with a 1–0 win; Blake made six saves to earn his 16th shutout of the year.

The Eastern Conference Final at Subaru Park was a repeat of the previous year's final with New York City FC, who were without forward Talles Magno and defender Maxime Chanot. New York City FC took the lead in the 57th minute with a strike from Maximiliano Moralez following a six-player passing sequence that began with goalkeeper Sean Johnson. A free kick from Glesnes in the 65th minute reached Julián Carranza, who scored the equalizer for the Union; Carranza then provided an assist on a goal two minutes later that was finished from close range by Gazdag. Substitute Cory Burke scored the match's final goal in the 76th minute, having dribbled from midfield into the penalty area; he lost the ball in the box, but received it again off a mis-timed clearance from the NYCFC defense and scored. The 3–1 result gave the Union their 11th consecutive home victory, equaling the longest streak in MLS history, and an undefeated record at home in 2022.

=== Summary of results ===
Note: In all results below, the score of the finalist is given first (H: home; A: away).

| Los Angeles FC | | Round | Philadelphia Union | |
|---|---|---|---|---|
| 1st place in Western Conference: Pos / Team / Pld / Pts; 1 / Los Angeles FC / 34 / 67; 2 / Austin FC / 34 / 56; 3 / FC Dallas / 34 / 53; 4 / LA Galaxy / 34 / 50; 5 / Nashville SC / 34 / 50; 6 / Minnesota United FC / 34 / 48; 7 / Real Salt Lake / 34 / 47; Source: MLS Qualified for playoffs Qualified for CONCACAF Champions League | | Regular season | 1st place in Eastern Conference: Pos / Team / Pld / Pts; 1 / Philadelphia Union / 34 / 67; 2 / CF Montréal / 34 / 65; 3 / New York City FC / 34 / 55; 4 / New York Red Bulls / 34 / 53; 5 / FC Cincinnati / 34 / 49; 6 / Inter Miami CF / 34 / 48; 7 / Orlando City SC / 34 / 48; Source: MLS Qualified for playoffs Qualified for CONCACAF Champions League | |
| Opponent | Score | MLS Cup Playoffs | Opponent | Score |
| Bye | | First round | Bye | |
| LA Galaxy | 3–2 (H) | Conference Semifinals | FC Cincinnati | 1–0 (H) |
| Austin FC | 3–0 (H) | Conference Finals | New York City FC | 3–1 (H) |

== Venue ==
MLS Cup 2022 was hosted on November 5, 2022, by LAFC at their home stadium Banc of California Stadium (renamed BMO Stadium in 2023) in Los Angeles, California by virtue of LAFC winning the Supporters’ Shield. It is a soccer-specific stadium that seats 22,000 people and opened in April 2018. Tickets were released days before the match and immediately sold out; ticket prices ranged from $450 to $10,000 on secondary markets. To promote the match, the Philip F. Anschutz Trophy was displayed at Union Station.

Due to a home USC Trojans football game later in the day at the neighboring Los Angeles Memorial Coliseum, which was also the homecoming game, LAFC announced that no parking spaces would be reserved for MLS Cup attendees at the stadium. The club encouraged the use of Metro light rail and bus options, offering free TAP cards for attendees, as well as a shuttle bus from Dodger Stadium with free parking. LAFC opened the stadium at 10:30 a.m. to encourage early arrivals and sold half-price concessions during the first hour.

The Union organized hotel-and-ticket packages for 460 fans to travel to the MLS Cup final in Los Angeles. The Union partnered with supporters group Sons of Ben to organize four free watch parties at venues in the Philadelphia area, including their home stadium Subaru Park.

== Broadcasting ==
MLS Cup 2022 was broadcast in the United States on Fox in English, and by Univision and TUDN in Spanish, with pre-game and post-game coverage. The Canadian broadcast was carried on TSN in English and on TVA Sports in French. The Fox English commentary team included their crew for the 2022 FIFA World Cup, including play-by-play announcer John Strong, analyst Stuart Holden, and studio host Rodolfo Landeros. For Univision, Luis Omar Tapia and Ramses Sandoval provided play-by-play commentary for alternating halves with analysts Diego Balado and Marcelo Balboa. Fox used 24 conventional cameras, including four for slow motion replays, a skycam, and a helicopter, along with 14 field microphones for their broadcast. The match was also carried by ESPN International in Latin America and Africa, DAZN in Europe and Brazil, Abu Dhabi Sports in the Middle East and North Africa, and Sky Sports in the United Kingdom and Ireland.

SiriusXM FC provided satellite radio coverage with commentators Joe Tolleson, Tony Meola, and Keith Costigan. For the Los Angeles radio market, the match was carried in English by ESPN 710 and in Spanish by KFWB 980. The Union hosted a radio stream of the final on their website with local television commentators JP Dellacamera and Danny Higginbotham.

The U.S. broadcast drew 2.16 million viewers, with 1.49 million on Fox and 668,000 on Univision, and had a national Nielsen rating of 0.69. It was the second-largest domestic television audience for an MLS Cup final after the 1997 edition and increased by 38 percent from the 2021 edition. The match was also the second-most-watched club soccer broadcast of 2022 in the United States behind the UEFA Champions League final. The MLS Cup final's penalty shootout was watched by approximately 26 percent of all households in the Philadelphia market; the market was also the largest for the Fox broadcast with a rating that averaged 4.78 (347,000 viewers) and peaked at 7.6 (552,000 viewers). The second-highest rating in the Houston market was one-third of Philadelphia's and is thought to have been affected by the World Series, which Fox broadcast immediately after the match. The largest market for the Univision broadcast was Los Angeles with a 1.06 rating, which made it the second-most-watched LAFC match in their home market after the 2019 Conference Semifinal against the LA Galaxy.

== Match ==
=== Summary ===
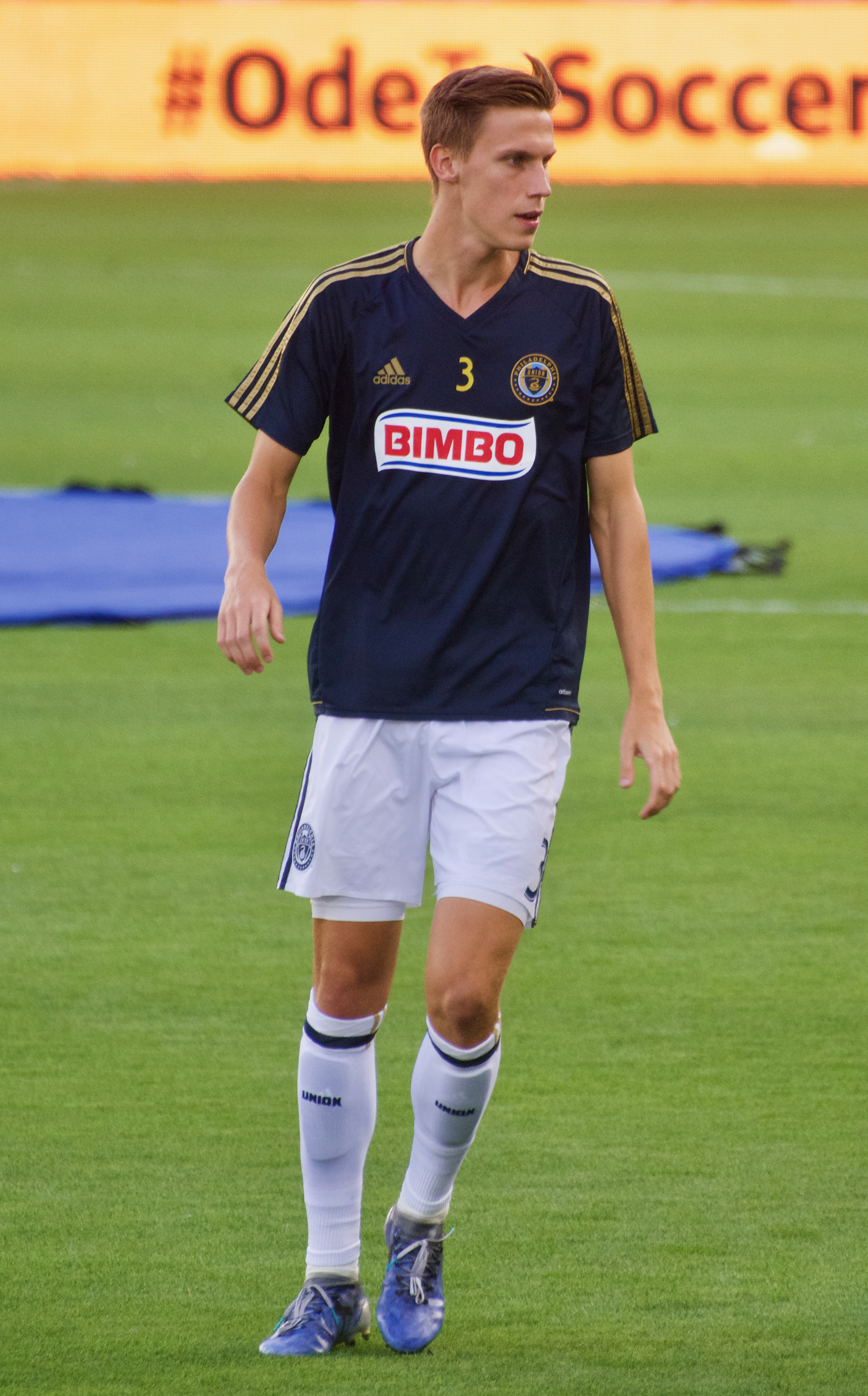
Union defender Jack Elliott (pictured in 2017) scored two goals in the MLS Cup final.

The MLS Cup final kicked off at 1:05 p.m. under clear skies and in front of 22,384 spectators, including 500 fans from Philadelphia in the southeast corner. The teams fielded most of their normal starting lineups with the exception of the Union's midfielder and captain Alejandro Bedoya, who was recovering from a hip injury but remained available as a substitute. Cherundolo used a 4–3–3 formation and declined to start Chiellini and Bale, while Curtin kept his standard 4–3–1–2 with Jack McGlynn replacing Bedoya in midfield. LAFC wore their home black kit while the Union chose their blue-and-yellow secondary jersey. Two-time MLS Referee of the Year Ismail Elfath was selected to officiate the MLS Cup; it was his first time for the tournament. Prior to kickoff, the LAFC supporters group 3252 unveiled a tifo depicting Dragon Ball manga character Gogeta, who shares the club's black-and-gold color scheme, and set off smoke flares.

The Union had the majority of possession and chances to start the first half but were unable to convert them into shots on goal. LAFC won a free kick near the penalty area that was awarded for a foul by José Andrés Martínez on Cristian Arango and used it to take the lead in the 28th minute; Jack McGlynn, who had jumped as part of the wall, deflected Kellyn Acosta's shot into the goal. LAFC won a free kick from a similar spot in the 39th minute which they almost scored from, but Andre Blake saved Diego Palacios's shot from close range. The Union responded with their own chance in the 43rd minute as Carranza started a counter-attack and fed the ball to Mikael Uhre, who dribbled it into the penalty area but lost it to Crépeau's block. The teams entered half-time with eight shots but LAFC held a 1–0 lead and the Union had the majority of possession.

The Union had their next chance to score early in the second half but several LAFC defenders stopped Uhre's run into the penalty area. The match was stopped twice within two minutes to check LAFC's Arango and the Union's Olivier Mbaizo for concussion symptoms after separate head collisions. After a corner kick for the Union was cleared out, Martínez took a shot from outside the penalty area that hit Dániel Gazdag, who collected the ball and scored in the 59th minute to tie the match at 1–1. Despite protests from LAFC's defenders, the goal was given because Gazdag was determined to be onside. Five minutes later, LAFC midfielder José Cifuentes was shown a yellow card for a collision with Blake during a corner kick, for which the goalkeeper had jumped to save. In the 83rd minute, centerback Jesús David Murillo headed in a Carlos Vela corner kick to give LAFC a 2–1 lead. The Union equalized two minutes later with a header from centerback Jack Elliott off a Kai Wagner free kick that was sent into the penalty area. During the celebrations, cups of beer thrown from the stands struck several Union players. LAFC attempted to retake the lead in stoppage time with a set piece but Blake saved a header by defender Sebastien Ibeagha shortly before the end of the period.

The match entered extra time, and LAFC had a chance to score after a loose ball was misplayed by Blake, but it was out of range for Dénis Bouanga. Julián Carranza had a chance to score for the Union shortly before extra time's half-time, but he was unable to head the cross from Kai Wagner into the goal. In the 110th minute, a long overhead ball from Mbaizo was misplayed by Murillo, whose backpass to his own goal was collected by Union substitute Cory Burke, who collided with Crépeau as he ran from the penalty area. Crépeau broke his right leg during the challenge and left the stadium in an ambulance, and Burke was substituted a few minutes later. Elfath initially showed Crépeau a yellow card, but after consulting with the video assistant referee, he sent him off in the 116th minute while leaving the pitch for his injury. LAFC played the rest of the match with 10 players and substituted Kwadwo Opoku for back-up goalkeeper John McCarthy, a former Union player and Philadelphia-area native who had only played once in the 2022 regular season.

Elfath awarded nine minutes of stoppage time due to the pauses in play to evaluate and treat Crépeau and Burke, as well as other interruptions. The Union pressed for a third goal and scored in the 124th minute through a corner kick by Wagner that was cleared and returned to the penalty area several times. The cross was directed by Carranza towards the goal and saved from close range by McCarthy, but Elliot tapped in the rebound from 3 yards (2.7 m) to score his second goal of the final. Elliott and several celebrating players were again showered with beer cans and cups thrown by the stands. In the 128th minute, LAFC equalized when Gareth Bale headed in a Diego Palacios cross; Bale had entered as a substitute during extra time and out-jumped Elliott for the ball. It was the latest goal scored in MLS Cup Playoffs history, replacing Elliott's goal scored four minutes earlier, and tied the match at 3–3 through the end of extra time.

The 2022 final was the sixth MLS Cup to be decided by a penalty shootout, which had also been used the previous year. Cristian Tello took LAFC's first kick, which Blake saved, but Gazdag slipped while running to take the Union's first, resulting in a miss that kept the shootout scoreless. Bouanga scored his second-round penalty while McCarthy saved Martínez's attempt after reading his stutter step. A successful conversion by Ryan Hollingshead, who sent Blake the wrong way, was followed by a McCarthy save on Kai Wagner to set up a decider in the fourth round. Ilie Sánchez's shot toward the bottom-right corner went under Blake during his attempt at a diving save, ending the shootout at 3–0 for LAFC.

=== Details ===
November 5, 2022
1:00 p.m. PDT

| Los Angeles FC | 3–3 (a.e.t.) | Philadelphia Union |
|---|---|---|
| Acosta 28'; Murillo 83'; Bale 120+8' | Report | Gazdag 59'; Elliott 85', 120+4' |
Penalties
| Tello (penalty missed); Bouanga (penalty scored); Hollingshead (penalty scored); Ilie (penalty scored) | 3–0 | (penalty missed) Gazdag; (penalty missed) Martínez; (penalty missed) Wagner |

Banc of California Stadium, Los Angeles, California
Attendance: 22,384
Referee: Ismail Elfath

| Los Angeles FC | Philadelphia Union |

| GK | 16 | (Canada) Maxime Crépeau | (red card) 116' |
| RB | 24 | (United States) Ryan Hollingshead |
| CB | 3 | (Colombia) Jesús David Murillo |
| CB | 25 | (United States) Sebastien Ibeagha | (yellow card) 87' |
| LB | 12 | (Ecuador) Diego Palacios |
| CM | 20 | (Ecuador) José Cifuentes | (yellow card) 65' |
| CM | 6 | (Spain) Ilie Sánchez |
| CM | 23 | (United States) Kellyn Acosta | | (substituted off) 91' |
| RF | 10 | (Mexico) Carlos Vela (c) | | (substituted off) 97' |
| CF | 9 | (Colombia) Cristian Arango | | (substituted off) 74' |
| LF | 99 | (Gabon) Dénis Bouanga |
Substitutes:
| GK | 77 | (United States) John McCarthy | | (substituted on) 117' |
| DF | 2 | (Argentina) Franco Escobar |
| DF | 4 | (Colombia) Eddie Segura |
| DF | 14 | (Italy) Giorgio Chiellini |
| MF | 7 | (Ghana) Latif Blessing |
| MF | 32 | (Ecuador) Sebas Méndez |
| FW | 11 | (Wales) Gareth Bale | | (substituted on) 97' |
| FW | 22 | (Ghana) Kwadwo Opoku | | (substituted on) 74' (substituted off) 117' |
| FW | 37 | (Spain) Cristian Tello | | (substituted on) 91' |
Manager:
(United States) Steve Cherundolo

| GK | 18 | (Jamaica) Andre Blake (c) |
| RB | 15 | (Cameroon) Olivier Mbaizo |
| CB | 5 | (Norway) Jakob Glesnes |
| CB | 3 | (England) Jack Elliott | (yellow card) 14' |
| LB | 27 | (Germany) Kai Wagner |
| DM | 8 | (Venezuela) José Martínez |
| CM | 16 | (United States) Jack McGlynn | | (substituted off) 84' |
| CM | 31 | (United States) Leon Flach |
| AM | 6 | (Hungary) Dániel Gazdag |
| CF | 9 | (Argentina) Julián Carranza | (yellow card) 90+1' |
| CF | 7 | (Denmark) Mikael Uhre | | (substituted off) 71' |
Substitutes:
| GK | 1 | (United States) Matt Freese |
| DF | 2 | (United States) Matthew Real |
| DF | 26 | (United States) Nathan Harriel |
| MF | 11 | (United States) Alejandro Bedoya |
| MF | 20 | (Venezuela) Jesús Bueno |
| MF | 30 | (United States) Paxten Aaronson | | (substituted on) 84' |
| MF | 33 | (United States) Quinn Sullivan |
| FW | 19 | (Jamaica) Cory Burke | | (substituted on) 71' (substituted off) 120+1' |
| FW | 25 | (United States) Chris Donovan | | (substituted on) 120+1' |
Manager:
(United States) Jim Curtin

MLS Cup MVP: John McCarthy (Los Angeles FC)

Assistant referees:
Corey Rockwell
Ian Anderson
Fourth official:
Fotis Bazakos
Reserve assistant referee:
Joe Dickerson
Video assistant referee:
Drew Fischer
Assistant video assistant referee:
Jeff Muschik
Reserve video assistant referee:
Jeffrey Greeson

Match rules

- 90 minutes
- 30 minutes of extra time if necessary
- Penalty shootout if scores still level
- Maximum of nine named substitutes
- Maximum of five substitutions, with a sixth allowed in extra time. Each team is only given three opportunities to make substitutions, with a fourth opportunity in extra time, excluding substitutions made at half-time, before the start of extra time, and at half-time in extra time. Two additional substitutions are available for concussed players.

== Post-match ==
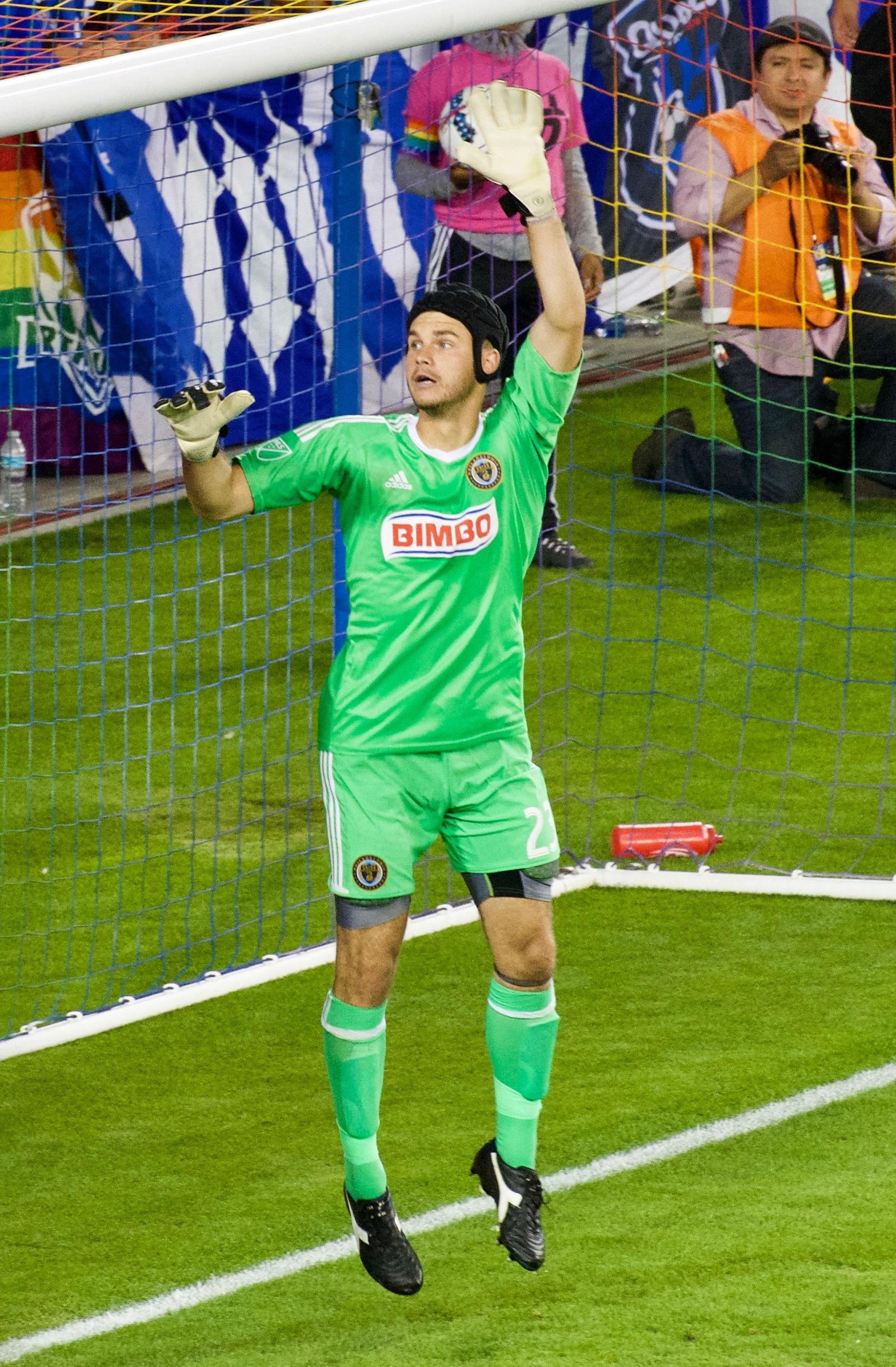
LAFC backup goalkeeper John McCarthy (pictured in 2017) was named MLS Cup MVP for his saves in the penalty shootout.

LAFC became the fifteenth team to win the MLS Cup and the ninth new champion since 2013; they were also the seventh host to win the MLS Cup in the decade since the neutral-site format was abolished. The club was the eighth to win a domestic double—composed of the Supporters' Shield and MLS Cup—and the first since Toronto FC in 2017. Several of the club's celebrity owners, including Magic Johnson, Mia Hamm, and Will Ferrell, as well as other entertainment industry figures, attended the match. LAFC celebrated their MLS Cup title with 5,000 fans at Banc of California Stadium's Christmas Tree Lane the following day in lieu of a traditional parade.

Steve Cherundolo became the second head coach to win the MLS Cup in his first year in the league, following Piotr Nowak with D.C. United in 2004. McCarthy, the first substitute goalkeeper to win the league championship, was named the MLS Cup Most Valuable Player for his penalty saves and maintaining the first shutout in a MLS Cup shootout. He said he was "absolutely devastated" for Crépeau and called the tackle on Burke the "play of the game"; Crépeau celebrated in the ambulance and later at the hospital through video calls to his teammates on the field and coach during the post-match press conference. The following day, LAFC announced Crépeau would be unable to join the Canadian national team at the 2022 FIFA World Cup due to his injury. Gareth Bale became the first player to score in the finals of the MLS Cup and UEFA Champions League, stating after the match he "seem[ed] to have a knack of doing that". Bale retired from professional soccer in January 2023.

The match was hailed as an "instant classic" and "the most thrilling" in the history of the MLS Cup; other commentators also ranked it as among the best in the league's history. The 2022 final equaled the highest-scoring MLS Cup final alongside the 2003 final, which was also the last time two top-seeded teams (the Chicago Fire and San Jose Earthquakes) were finalists; it was also the first time both finalists had scored three goals, as the scoreline in 2003 was 4–2. Commissioner Don Garber said it "was Major League Soccer at its very best", while Carlos Vela labeled the finish "a Hollywood movie". Union coach Jim Curtin described the match as "chaotic" and "what a final should be", but also as "a heartbreaking loss, no question". He also stated he "lived through the 130 minutes and aged probably five, six years", and complimented his players on their accomplishment in getting to the final. The Philadelphia Phillies of Major League Baseball lost the World Series later in the day, making Philadelphia the first U.S. city to lose two major league sports championships on the same day.

Both finalists had already qualified for the 2023 CONCACAF Champions League with their regular season performances. The leftover slot was awarded to Austin FC, the next-best eligible team from the United States in the 2022 regular season standings. The MLS Cup finalists faced each other again in the Champions League semifinals, which LAFC won 4–1 on aggregate to advance to their second continental final, which they lost. As MLS Cup champions, LAFC also directly qualified for the knockout stage of the 2023 Leagues Cup and hosted the 2023 Campeones Cup against Tigres UANL of Mexico, losing in a penalty shootout.
