= Revelations Cup =

International football tournament

- Organiser(s): Mexican Football Federation (FMF)
- Founded: 2021; 5 years ago
- Region: Mexico
- Teams: 4
- Broadcaster(s): TUDN (Mexico); TUDN (USA)

The Revelations Cup is an international association football tournament organized by Mexican Football Federation (FMF) for men's under-20 national teams. The inaugural tournament took place in November 2021 in Guanajuato, Mexico.

A third edition was organized in 2026 with participation from the Japan national under-20 football team and Piratas_F.C.

== Locations ==
Year	Stadium	City	State	Country
2021	Estadio Miguel Alemán Valdés	Celaya	Guanajuato	Mexico
2022	Estadio Ciudad de los Deportes y Cancha Centenario	Mexico City	Mexico City	Mexico
2026	Estadio Luis "Pirata" Fuente	Veracruz	Veracruz	Mexico

== Format ==
Four U-20 teams—Mexico, the United States, Brazil, and Colombia—were announced as participants for the inaugural edition of the tournament in 2021. They played against each other in a round-robin format for a total of 3 matches per team. The team with the most points were declared winners.

Tiebreakers:

- Greater goal difference
- Highest number of goals scored
- Highest number of points between tied teams

== Tournaments ==
All times are local, CST (UTC–6).

=== 2021 Revelations Cup ===
Pos	Team	Pld	W	D	L	GF	GA	GD	Pts	Final result
1	Mexico (H, C)	3	2	1	0	4	2	+2	7	Champions
2	Brazil	3	2	0	1	8	4	+4	6	
3	Colombia	3	0	2	1	3	4	−1	2	
4	United States	3	0	1	2	2	7	−5	1	

Source: Revelations Cup
(C) Champions; (H) Hosts
10 November 2021
17:00 UTC−6

United States	0–4	Brazil
	Report	Marcos Leonardo 11', 20', 51'; Keven 42'

Estadio Miguel Alemán Valdés, Celaya
10 November 2021
19:30 UTC−6

Mexico	0–0	Colombia

Estadio Miguel Alemán Valdés, Celaya

13 November 2021
15:30 UTC−6

United States	1–1	Colombia
Clark 34'	Report	Ángel 90+5'

Estadio Miguel Alemán Valdés, Celaya
13 November 2021
18:00 UTC−6

Mexico	2–1	Brazil
J. Pérez 33'; Flores 65'		Werton 49'

Estadio Miguel Alemán Valdés, Celaya

16 November 2021
17:00 UTC−6

Mexico	2–1	United States
Flores 6'; Ávila 62'		Luna 50'

Estadio Miguel Alemán Valdés, Celaya
16 November 2021
19:30 UTC−6

Colombia	2–3	Brazil
Cantillo 33', 80'		Andrey 7', 40'; Matheus 82'

Estadio Miguel Alemán Valdés, Celaya

==== Goalscorers ====
There were 17 goals scored in 6 matches, for an average of 2.83 goals per match.

3 goals

- (Brazil) Marcos Leonardo

2 goals

- (Brazil) Andrey
- (Colombia) Carlos Cantillo
- (Mexico) Marcelo Flores

1 goal

- (Brazil) Keven
- (Brazil) Matheus
- (Brazil) Werton
- (Colombia) Tomás Ángel
- (Mexico) Ali Ávila
- (Mexico) Jonathan Pérez
- (United States) Caden Clark
- (United States) Diego Luna

=== 2022 Revelations Cup ===
Pos	Team	Pld	W	D	L	GF	GA	GD	Pts	Final result
1	Mexico (H, C)	3	2	1	0	5	3	+2	7	Champions
2	United States	3	2	0	1	6	3	+3	6	
3	Paraguay	3	0	2	1	2	4	−2	2	
4	Peru	3	0	1	2	3	6	−3	1	

Source: Revelations Cup
(C) Champions; (H) Hosts
21 September 2022
14:00 UTC−6

Peru	1–3	United States
Vásquez 17'	Report	Gutiérrez 45+2'; Craig 68'; Luna 84'

Cancha Centenario, Mexico City
21 September 2022
19:00 UTC−6

Mexico	1–1	Paraguay
Flores 28' (o.g.)		González 56' (pen.)

Estadio Ciudad de los Deportes, Mexico City

24 September 2022
16:00 UTC−6

Mexico	2–1	United States
Torres 18'; Mancha 22'	Report	Luna 35' (pen.)

Estadio Ciudad de los Deportes, Mexico City
24 September 2022
19:00 UTC−6

Paraguay	1–1	Peru
Duarte 53'	Report	Olaya 63'

Estadio Ciudad de los Deportes, Mexico City

27 September 2022
16:00 UTC−6

Mexico	2–1	Peru
Zamora 38'; Uribe 49'		Goicochea 69'

Estadio Ciudad de los Deportes, Mexico City
27 September 2022
19:00 UTC−6

United States	2–0	Paraguay
Paredes 5'; Gutiérrez 28'

Estadio Ciudad de los Deportes, Mexico City

==== Goalscorers ====
There were 16 goals scored in 6 matches, for an average of 2.67 goals per match.

2 goals

- (United States) Brian Gutiérrez
- (United States) Diego Luna

1 goal

- (Mexico) Joshua Mancha
- (Mexico) Christian Torres
- (Mexico) Héctor Uribe
- (Mexico) Saúl Zamora
- (Paraguay) Blas Duarte
- (Paraguay) Diego González
- (Peru) Juan Pablo Goicochea
- (Peru) Stefano Olaya
- (Peru) Diether Vásquez
- (United States) Brandan Craig
- (United States) Kevin Paredes

1 own goal

- (Paraguay) Gilberto Flores (against Mexico)
