= 2024 Los Angeles FC 2 season =

American soccer team

LAFC2
2024 season
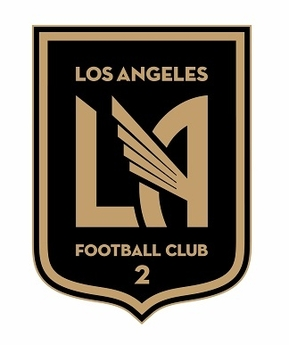
- Owner: Los Angeles FC
- Head coach: Junior Gonzalez
- Stadium: Titan Stadium; Fullerton, California
- MLS Next Pro: Western Conference: 5th Overall: 9th
Home colors	Away colors

Los Angeles FC 2 is an American professional soccer team that is located in the Greater Los Angeles, California area. It is the reserve team of Los Angeles FC and participates in MLS Next Pro.

== Regular season ==
During the regular season, teams played 28 matches each in a mostly regionalized schedule. Each conference was divided into divisions of seven or eight teams for scheduling.

== Team roster ==
MLS Next Pro allows for up to 35 players on a roster. Roster slots 1 through 24 are reserved for players on professional contracts. The remaining 11 slots are for amateur MLS Academy players (who are unpaid, must be under the age of 21, be part of the team's academy, and have never signed a professional contract or played in the NCAA).

== Players and staff ==
=== Current roster ===
As of July 6, 2024

No.	Pos.	Nation	Player
4	DF	COL	Eddie Segura
12	GK	CAN	Thomas Hasal
18	MF	USA	Erik Dueñas
27	FW	SLV	Nathan Ordaz
31	GK	MEX	David Ochoa
32	DF	USA	Shakir Nixon
35	DF	USA	David Soto
36	MF	USA	Tommy Musto
39	FW	USA	Nicklaus Sullivan
40	MF	USA	Christopher Jaime
41	GK	USA	Ethan Scally
42	DF	USA	Luca Bombino
43	MF	USA	Diego Rosales
44	DF	USA	Christian Díaz
45	DF	USA	Kenny Nielsen
46	MF	USA	DeCarlo Guerra
47	FW	USA	Marius Aiyenero
48	MF	USA	Gavin Zambrano
49	FW	USA	Javier Hernandez
51	GK	USA	Dylan Auffret
52	DF	MEX	Javen Romero
55	MF	USA	Bajung Darboe
56	MF	USA	Jude Terry
59	MF	USA	James Lane
60	MF	USA	Matias Wanchope
62	DF	USA	Josh Santiago
65	DF	USA	Adrian Sanders
66	MF	USA	Bryan Moyado
70	MF	USA	Matt Evans
71	MF	MEX	James Arteaga
73	DF	USA	Eddy Berumen
77	FW	IDN	Adrian Wibowo
79	FW	USA	Dempsey Resich
81	FW	USA	Charlie Rosenthal
82	MF	USA	Aidan Martin
88	MF	SLV	Adrián Aguilar
91	FW	GER	Luis Müller
92	DF	USA	Emir Ponciano

Signed to first team contract with Los Angeles FC
Los Angeles FC Academy player.

=== Staff ===
Coaching Staff
Head Coach	Junior Gonzalez
Assistant Coach	Fabian Sandoval
Assistant Coach	Claine Plummer

==== Standings ====
Western Conference

Pos	Div	Team	Pld	W	SOW	SOL	L	GF	GA	GD	Pts	Qualification
1	FR	North Texas SC	28	16	6	2	4	56	32	+24	62	Qualification for the Playoffs
2	FR	St. Louis City 2	28	17	1	3	7	53	35	+18	56	Qualification for the Playoffs
3	PC	The Town FC	28	13	4	4	7	41	28	+13	51	Qualification for the Playoffs
4	PC	Tacoma Defiance	28	13	2	3	10	59	53	+6	46	Qualification for the Playoffs
5	PC	Los Angeles FC 2	28	12	3	3	10	51	54	−3	45	Qualification for the Playoffs
6	PC	Ventura County FC	28	8	8	3	9	49	49	0	43	Qualification for the Playoffs
7	PC	Whitecaps FC 2	28	10	3	4	11	45	44	+1	40	Qualification for the Playoffs
8	FR	Houston Dynamo 2	28	10	2	5	11	46	45	+1	39	Qualification for the Playoffs
9	PC	Real Monarchs	28	9	5	2	12	39	41	−2	39	
10	FR	Sporting Kansas City II	28	10	2	4	12	53	57	−4	38	
11	PC	Portland Timbers 2	28	8	4	6	10	43	45	−2	38	
12	FR	Austin FC II	28	7	4	7	10	44	49	−5	36	
13	FR	Minnesota United FC 2	28	8	4	0	16	43	73	−30	32	
14	FR	Colorado Rapids 2	28	6	1	3	18	37	54	−17	23	

Source: MLSNP Western Conference
Rules for classification: 1) points; 2) total wins; 3) total goal differential; 4) total goals scored; 5) fewer disciplinary points; 6) away goal differential; 7) away goals scored; 8) home goals differential; 9) home goals scored; 10) coin toss (2 clubs tied) or drawing of lots (≥3 clubs tied)

Overall table

Pos	Team	Pld	W	SOW	SOL	L	GF	GA	GD	Pts	Awards
1	North Texas SC	28	16	6	2	4	56	32	+24	62	Regular season champion
2	St. Louis City 2	28	17	1	3	7	53	35	+18	56	
3	FC Cincinnati 2	28	16	2	2	8	47	34	+13	54	
4	Philadelphia Union II	28	15	3	1	9	59	41	+18	52	
5	The Town FC	28	13	4	4	7	41	28	+13	51	
6	Inter Miami CF II	28	14	0	6	8	53	45	+8	48	
7	Chicago Fire FC II	28	11	5	4	8	51	51	0	47	
8	Tacoma Defiance	28	13	2	3	10	59	53	+6	46	
9	Orlando City B	28	11	4	5	8	53	42	+11	46	
10	Los Angeles FC 2	28	12	3	3	10	51	54	−3	45	
11	New York City FC II	28	11	3	6	8	58	46	+12	45	
12	Columbus Crew 2	28	11	4	4	9	53	47	+6	45	
13	Crown Legacy FC	28	11	5	2	10	51	46	+5	45	
14	Chattanooga FC	28	9	8	2	9	45	42	+3	45	
15	Carolina Core FC	28	12	3	1	12	39	45	−6	43	
16	Ventura County FC	28	8	8	3	9	49	49	0	43	
17	Whitecaps FC 2	28	10	3	4	11	45	44	+1	40	
18	New York Red Bulls II	28	10	4	2	12	56	61	−5	40	
19	Houston Dynamo 2	28	10	2	5	11	46	45	+1	39	
20	Real Monarchs	28	9	5	2	12	39	41	−2	39	
21	Sporting Kansas City II	28	10	2	4	12	53	57	−4	38	
22	Portland Timbers 2	28	8	4	6	10	43	45	−2	38	
23	Toronto FC II	28	10	1	5	12	44	51	−7	37	
24	Austin FC II	28	7	4	7	10	44	49	−5	36	
25	Minnesota United FC 2	28	8	4	0	16	43	73	−30	32	
26	Atlanta United 2	28	7	4	3	14	42	64	−22	32	
27	Huntsville City FC	28	8	0	5	15	39	53	−14	29	
28	Colorado Rapids 2	28	6	1	3	18	37	54	−17	23	
29	New England Revolution II	28	4	4	2	18	37	59	−22	22	

Source: MLSNP
Rules for classification: 1) points; 2) total wins; 3) total goal differential; 4) total goals scored; 5) fewer disciplinary points; 6) away goal differential; 7) away goals scored; 8) home goals differential; 9) home goals scored; 10) coin toss (2 clubs tied) or drawing of lots (≥3 clubs tied)

==== Matches ====
March 17 1	Los Angeles FC 2	4–1	Minnesota United FC 2	Fullerton, CA
		Report		Stadium: Titan Stadium; Referee: Mark Verso

March 24 2	Los Angeles FC 2	3–2	Houston Dynamo 2	Fullerton, CA
		Report		Stadium: Titan Stadium; Referee: Dion Coxe-Trieger

March 31 3	Colorado Rapids 2	1–1 (4–3 SO)	Los Angeles FC 2	Commerce City, CO
		Report		Stadium: Dick's Sporting Goods Park; Referee: JC Griggs

April 7 4	Tacoma Defiance	2–0	Los Angeles FC 2	Tukwila, WA
		Report		Stadium: Starfire Sports Complex; Referee: Elijio Arreguin

April 14 5	Los Angeles FC 2	2–1	Ventura County FC	Fullerton, CA
		Report		Stadium: Titan Stadium; Referee: Benjamin Meyer

April 28 6	Los Angeles FC 2	2–0	Portland Timbers 2	Fullerton, CA
		Report		Stadium: Titan Stadium; Referee: Kelsey Harms

May 5 7	Real Monarchs	2–3	Los Angeles FC 2	Herriman, UT
		Report		Stadium: Zions Bank Stadium; Referee: Muhammad Hassan

May 12 8	Los Angeles FC 2	3–4	Whitecaps FC 2	Fullerton, CA
		Report		Stadium: Titan Stadium; Referee: Greg Dopka

May 19 9	The Town FC	0–0 (6–5 SO)	Los Angeles FC 2	Moraga, CA
		Report		Stadium: St. Mary’s College; Referee: Brandon Stevis

May 24 10	Austin FC II	1–2	Los Angeles FC 2	Austin, TX
		Report		Stadium: Parmer Field; Referee: John Matto

June 2 11	Los Angeles FC 2	0–4	North Texas SC	Fullerton, CA
		Report		Stadium: Titan Stadium; Referee: Ricardo Fierro

June 9 12	Whitecaps FC 2	4–0	Los Angeles FC 2	Burnaby, BC
		Report		Stadium: Swangard Stadium; Referee: David Schmidt-Schweda

June 23 13	Los Angeles FC 2	2–0	The Town FC	Fullerton, CA
		Report		Stadium: Titan Stadium; Referee: Jaclyn Metz

June 28 14	Los Angeles FC 2	3–2	Colorado Rapids 2	Fullerton, CA
		Report		Stadium: Titan Stadium; Referee: Servando Berna

July 6 15	St. Louis City 2	4–3	Los Angeles FC 2	St. Louis, MO
		Report		Stadium: CITYPARK; Referee: Drew Klemp

July 14 16	Los Angeles FC 2	1–1 (5-4 SO)	Ventura County FC	Fullerton, CA
		Report		Stadium: Titan Stadium; Referee: Katja Koroleva

July 20 17	Tacoma Defiance	4–4 (5–3 SO)	Los Angeles FC 2	Seattle, WA
		Report		Stadium: Lumen Field; Referee: William Hale

July 28 18	Houston Dynamo 2	2–1	Los Angeles FC 2	Houston, TX
		Report		Stadium: SaberCats Stadium; Referee: Corbyn May

August 4 19	Los Angeles FC 2	2–1	Real Monarchs	Fullerton, CA
		Report		Stadium: Titan Stadium; Referee: Iryna Petrunok

August 11 20	Ventura County FC	1–2	Los Angeles FC 2	Thousand Oaks, CA
		Report		Stadium: Venue William Rolland Stadium; Referee: Brad Jensen

August 16 21	Los Angeles FC 2	2–2 (5–3 SO)	Portland Timbers 2	Fullerton, CA
		Report		Stadium: Titan Stadium; Referee: Robert Vincze

August 25 22	Whitecaps FC 2	2–2 (7–6 SO)	Los Angeles FC 2	Burnaby, BC
		Report		Stadium: Swangard Stadium; Referee: David Schmidt-Schweda

August 30 23	Los Angeles FC 2	1–2	Tacoma Defiance	Fullerton, CA
		Report		Stadium: Titan Stadium; Referee: Corbyn May

September 8 24	Los Angeles FC 2	2–1	Sporting Kansas City II	Fullerton, CA
		Report		Stadium: Titan Stadiium; Referee: Mark Verso

September 14 25	Portland Timbers 2	2–3	Los Angeles FC 2	Portland, OR
		Report		Stadium: Providence Park; Referee: Emmy Nonso

September 23 26	Los Angeles FC 2	0–2	Real Monarchs	Fullerton, CA
		Report		Stadium: Titan Stadium; Referee: Servando Berna

September 29 27	The Town FC	2–0	Los Angeles FC 2	Moraga, CA
		Report		Stadium: St. Mary’s College; Referee: Jalen Gray

October 6 28	Sporting Kansas City II	4–3	Los Angeles FC 2	Kansas City, KS
		Report		Stadium: Children's Mercy Victory Field; Referee: Kyle Johnston
