= 2026 Los Angeles FC season =

Los Angeles FC
2026 season
- General manager: John Thorrington
- Head coach: Marc Dos Santos (until September 27); Xavi Tamarit (interim, from October 1)
- Stadium: BMO Stadium
- MLS: Conference: 6th Overall: 13th
- MLS Cup playoffs: Round one
- CONCACAF Champions Cup: Semifinals
- Leagues Cup: League phase
- Top goalscorer: League: Denis Bouanga (18); All: Denis Bouanga (25)
- Biggest win: LAFC 6–0 Orlando City
- Biggest defeat: Toluca 4–0 LAFC
Home colors	Away colors
- All statistics correct as of November 7, 2026.

The 2026 Los Angeles FC season is the club's ninth season in Major League Soccer, the top tier of the American soccer pyramid. LAFC plays its home matches at BMO Stadium in the Exposition Park neighborhood of Los Angeles, California. On December 5, 2025, assistant coach Marc Dos Santos was announced as the club's third head coach. Dos Santos was dismissed on September 27 due to poor results.

== Squad ==
=== First-team roster ===
As of November 7, 2026

No.	Name	Nationality	Pos	Date of birth (age)	Apps	Goals
1	Hugo Lloris	France	GK	December 26, 1986 (age 39)	29	0
12	Thomas Hasal	Canada	GK	July 9, 1999 (age 27)	3	0
31	Cabral Carter	United States	GK	May 7, 2004 (age 22)	3	0
4	Eddie Segura	Colombia	DF	February 2, 1997 (age 29)	27	1
5	Ryan Porteous	Scotland	DF	March 25, 1999 (age 27)	29	0
14	Sergi Palencia	Spain	DF	March 23, 1996 (age 30)	18	1
23	Yevhen Cheberko	Ukraine	DF	January 23, 1998 (age 28)	19	0
24	Ryan Hollingshead	United States	DF	April 16, 1991 (age 35)	26	1
29	Artem Smolyakov	Ukraine	DF	May 29, 2003 (age 23)	5	0
33	Aaron Long	United States	DF	October 12, 1992 (age 34)	17	0
45	Kenny Nielsen	United States	DF	February 13, 2002 (age 24)	6	0
91	Nkosi Tafari	United States	DF	March 23, 1997 (age 29)	24	0
6	Igor Jesus	Brazil	MF	March 7, 2003 (age 23)	8	0
8	Mark Delgado	United States	MF	May 16, 1995 (age 31)	32	2
11	Timothy Tillman	United States	MF	January 4, 1999 (age 27)	19	1
20	Sergio Vasquez	Ecuador	MF	January 4, 2004 (age 22)	6	1
21	Ryan Raposo	Canada	MF	March 5, 1999 (age 27)	15	0
22	Jude Terry (HG)	United States	MF	October 8, 2008 (age 18)	12	2
66	Mathieu Choinière	Canada	MF	February 7, 1999 (age 27)	33	2
70	Matt Evans	Guatemala	MF	May 25, 2006 (age 20)	1	0
81	Leo Walta	Finland	MF	June 24, 2003 (age 23)	6	2
7	Son Heung-min	South Korea	FW	8 July 1992 (aged 32)	31	7
9	Armindo Sieb	Germany	FW	February 17, 2003 (age 23)	11	1
17	Jeremy Ebobisse	United States	FW	February 14, 1997 (age 29)	16	0
18	Jacob Shaffelburg	Canada	FW	November 26, 1999 (age 26)	21	0
19	Tyler Boyd	United States	FW	December 30, 1994 (age 31)	28	1
43	Thayllon Roberth	Brazil	FW	August 18, 2006 (age 20)	1	0
47	Marius Aiyenero	Canada	FW	May 23, 2008 (age 18)	1	0
77	Adrian Wibowo (HG)	Indonesia	FW	January 17, 2006 (age 20)	0	0
90	Tommy Mihalić	United States	FW	November 9, 2002 (age 24)	2	0
99	Denis Bouanga	Gabon	FW	November 11, 1994 (age 32)	32	18

=== Players that made appearances, but have left the club ===
No.	Name	Nationality	Pos	Date of birth (age)	Apps	Goals
46	Stephen Eustáquio	Canada	MF	December 21, 1996 (age 29)	10	1
65	Amin Boudri	Sweden	MF	September 29, 2004 (age 22)	4	0
27	Nathan Ordaz (HG)	El Salvador	FW	January 12, 2004 (age 22)	9	2
30	David Martínez	Venezuela	FW	February 7, 2006 (age 20)	18	6

== Coaching staff ==
As of January 11, 2026

Technical staff
Head coach	(Spain) Xavi Tamarit (interim)
Assistant coach	(Spain) Enrique Duran
Assistant coach	(England) Andy Rose
Assistant/Goalkeeping coach	(North Macedonia) Oka Nikolov
Assistant coach/Performance director	(South Africa) Gavin Benjafield
Co-President & General Manager	(United States) John Thorrington
Technical Director	(Scotland) Neil McGuinness

== Transfers ==
=== Transfers in ===
Entry date	Position	Player	From club	Notes	Ref.
December 9, 2025	MF	(Canada) Mathieu Choinière	(Switzerland) Grasshopper	Exercised option to buy	
December 29, 2025	FW	(Canada) Jacob Shaffelburg	(United States) Nashville SC	Trade	
January 8, 2026	MF	(Guatemala) Matt Evans	(United States) Los Angeles FC 2	Homegrown signing	
January 8, 2026	GK	(United States) Cabral Carter	(United States) Los Angeles FC 2	First-team signing	
January 14, 2026	FW	(United States) Tyler Boyd	Unattached (Note: Signed previously with Nashville SC.)	Free agent	
January 24, 2026	MF	(Sweden) Amin Boudri	(Sweden) GAIS	Transfer	
March 23, 2026	DF	(United States) Christian Diaz	(United States) Los Angeles FC 2	Homegrown signing	
June 9, 2026	DF	(Ukraine) Yevhen Cheberko	(United States) Columbus Crew	Trade; Joining July 13	
August 13, 2026	FW	(Germany) Armindo Sieb	(Germany) Bayern Munich	Transfer	
August 25, 2026	MF	(Ecuador) Sergio Vásquez	(Ecuador) Orense	Transfer	

=== Transfers out ===
Exit date	Position	Player	To club	Notes	Ref.
November 18, 2025	DF	(United States) Luca Bombino	(United States) San Diego FC	Trade	
November 26, 2025	FW	(Romania) Alexandru Băluță	(Turkey) Boluspor	Declined contract options	
November 26, 2025	MF	(Brazil) Jailson		Declined contract options	
November 26, 2025	MF	(United States) Adam Saldana		Declined contract options	
November 26, 2025	GK	(Mexico) David Ochoa		Declined contract options	
December 31, 2025	MF	(United States) Frankie Amaya	(Mexico) Toluca	End of loan	
December 31, 2025	MF	(Norway) Odin Thiago Holm	(Scotland) Celtic	End of loan	
December 31, 2025	MF	(Republic of Ireland) Andrew Moran	(England) Brighton & Hove Albion	End of loan	
January 16, 2026	MF	(Ghana) Yaw Yeboah		Mutual Consent	
May 29, 2026	DF	(Italy) Lorenzo Dellavalle		Contract terminated	
June 30, 2026	MF	(Canada) Stephen Eustáquio	(Portugal) Porto	End of loan	
July 13, 2026	FW	(El Salvador) Nathan Ordaz	(United States) D.C. United	Trade	
July 22, 2026	MF	(Sweden) Amin Boudri	(Sweden) Hammarby IF	Transfer	
September 1, 2026	FW	(Venezuela) David Martínez	(Denmark) Midtjylland	Transfer	

=== Loans in ===
Date from	Pos.	Player	From	Details	End date	Ref.
February 6, 2026	MF	(Canada) Stephen Eustáquio	(Portugal) Porto	Short-term loan with purchase option	June 30, 2026	
August 31, 2026	MF	(Finland) Leo Walta	(Wales) Swansea City	Short-term loan with purchase option	December 31, 2026	
September 3, 2026	FW	(Brazil) Thayllon Roberth	(Brazil) Avaí	Year-long loan with purchase option	June 30, 2027	

=== Out on loan ===
No.	Player	To Club	Start date	End date	Notes	Ref.
77	(Indonesia) Adrian Wibowo	(Austria) Wacker Innsbruck	June 15, 2026	June 30, 2027	Year-long loan	
70	(Guatemala) Matt Evans	(Austria) Wacker Innsbruck	July 9, 2026	June 30, 2027	Year-long loan	
29	(Ukraine) Artem Smolyakov	(Ukraine) FC Kharkiv	July 28, 2026	June 30, 2027	Year-long loan with purchase option	

=== Draft picks ===
Round	#	Position	Player	College/Club Team	Reference	Status
1	24	DF	(United States) Giuliano Fravolini Whitchurch	Princeton University		Signed with Los Angeles FC 2.
2	No draft selection					
3	84	MF	(United States) Iain Wagner	University of San Diego		

== Non-competitive matches ==
Win Draw Loss

All matches are listed with their kickoff in Pacific Time.

=== Preseason ===
January 20 Friendly	Los Angeles FC	v	Bayern Munich II	Los Angeles
				Stadium: LAFC Performance Center; Attendance: 0
Note: Score was not made public.

January 24 Friendly	Los Angeles FC	1–0	Orange County SC	Los Angeles
	Bouanga			Stadium: LAFC Performance Center; Attendance: 0
Note: Match was played behind closed doors.

January 28 Friendly	Los Angeles FC	2–2	Portland Timbers	Los Angeles
				Stadium: BMO Stadium; Attendance: 0
Note: Match was played behind closed doors.

February 4 Friendly	Los Angeles FC	3–0	San Jose Earthquakes	Indio, California
				Stadium: Empire Polo Club; Attendance: 0
Note: Match was played behind closed doors.

February 8 Coachella Valley Invitational	Los Angeles FC	1–1	New York City FC	Indio, California
12:00 PM	Bouanga 88'		Fernández 51'	Stadium: Empire Polo Club

== Competitive matches ==
=== MLS ===
==== Standings ====
===== Western Conference =====
MLS Western Conference table (2026)
Pos	Team	Pld	W	L	T	GF	GA	GD	Pts	Qualification
4	San Jose Earthquakes	34	14	10	10	57	51	+6	52	Qualification for round one
5	Houston Dynamo FC	34	14	11	9	43	43	0	51	Qualification for round one
6	Los Angeles FC	34	12	11	11	52	40	+12	47	Qualification for round one
7	Portland Timbers	34	13	14	7	62	61	+1	46	Qualification for round one
8	Seattle Sounders FC	34	12	12	10	44	46	−2	46	Qualification for the wild card round

Source: MLS
Rules for classification: 1) points; 2) total wins; 3) total goal differential; 4) total goals scored; 5) fewer disciplinary points; 6) away goal differential; 7) away goals scored; 8) home goals differential; 9) home goals scored; 10) coin toss (2 clubs tied) or drawing of lots (≥3 clubs tied)

===== Overall =====
Overall MLS standings table
Pos	Team	Pld	W	L	T	GF	GA	GD	Pts
11	Philadelphia Union	34	14	12	8	66	52	+14	50
12	Columbus Crew	34	14	15	5	59	52	+7	47
13	Los Angeles FC	34	12	11	11	52	40	+12	47
14	Portland Timbers	34	13	14	7	62	61	+1	46
15	Orlando City SC	34	13	14	7	63	78	−15	46

Source: MLS
Rules for classification: 1) points; 2) total wins; 3) total goal differential; 4) total goals scored; 5) fewer disciplinary points; 6) away goal differential; 7) away goals scored; 8) home goals differential; 9) home goals scored; 10) coin toss (2 clubs tied) or drawing of lots (≥3 clubs tied)

===== Matches =====
All matches are in Pacific time.

=== February ===
February 21 1	Los Angeles FC	3–0	Inter Miami CF	Los Angeles
6:30 PM	Martínez 38'; Bouanga 73', (yellow card) 80'; Ordaz 90+4'	Report	Falcón (yellow card) 45+3'; Segovia (yellow card) 80'	Stadium: Los Angeles Memorial Coliseum; Attendance: 75,673; Referee: Pierre-Luc Lauziere

February 28 2	Houston Dynamo FC	0–2	Los Angeles FC	Houston, Texas
5:30 PM	McGlynn (yellow card) 22'; Carlos (red card) 45+2'; Bouzat (red card) 76'	Report	Bouanga (yellow card) 35'; Delgado (yellow card) 51', (goal) 56'; Porteous (yellow card) 63'; Eustáquio 82'	Stadium: Shell Energy Stadium; Attendance: 20,853; Referee: Jon Freemon

=== March ===
March 7 3	Los Angeles FC	1–0	FC Dallas	Los Angeles
7:30 PM	Son Heung-Min (yellow card) 10'; Martínez 55'; Boyd (yellow card) 82'	Report	Moore (yellow card) 45'; Ramiro (yellow card) 60'	Stadium: BMO Stadium; Attendance: 22,130; Referee: Drew Fischer

March 14 4	Los Angeles FC	2–0	St. Louis City SC	Los Angeles
7:30 PM	Choinière 73', 81'	Report		Stadium: BMO Stadium; Attendance: 22,266; Referee: Rosendo Mendoza

March 21 5	Austin FC	0–0	Los Angeles FC	Austin, Texas
5:30 PM	Bell (yellow card) 45+2'; Uzuni (yellow card) 65'; Desler (yellow card) 84'	Report	Tillman (yellow card) 21'; Segura (yellow card) 41'	Stadium: Q2 Stadium; Attendance: 20,738; Referee: Rubiel Vazquez

=== April ===
April 4 6	Los Angeles FC	6–0	Orlando City SC	Los Angeles
6:30 PM	Brekalo 8' (o.g.); Bouanga 20', 23', 28', (yellow card) 27'; Palencia 39'; Boyd 70'; Martínez (yellow card) 79'		Atuesta (yellow card) 21'; McGuire (yellow card) 66'; Angulo (yellow card) 84'	Stadium: BMO Stadium; Attendance: 22,185; Referee: Alexis Da Silva

April 11 7	Portland Timbers	2–1	Los Angeles FC	Portland, Oregon
1:45 PM	Fory (yellow card) 7'; Velde 32', (yellow card) 82'; Kelsy 90+6'	Report	Evans (yellow card) 14'; Terry 49'; Smolyakov (yellow card) 58'	Stadium: Providence Park; Attendance: 24,686; Referee: Armando Villarreal
Note: LAFC's head coach Marc Dos Santos shown a yellow card at minute 90+5.

April 19 8	Los Angeles FC	1–4	San Jose Earthquakes	Los Angeles
4:00 PM	Tillman (yellow card) 24'; Porteous (yellow card) 58'; Bouanga (yellow card) 63'; Roberts 75' (o.g.)	Report	Leroux (yellow card) 52'; Bouda 54', 80'; Werner 57'; Porteous 59' (o.g.); Roberts (yellow card) 62'; Harkes (yellow card) 90'	Stadium: BMO Stadium; Attendance: 22,114; Referee: Joe Dickerson

April 22 9	Los Angeles FC	0–0	Colorado Rapids	Los Angeles
7:30 PM	Palencia (yellow card) 64'; Tafari (yellow card) 90+2'	Report	Thompson (yellow card) 40'; Ojediran (yellow card) 68'; Minoungou (yellow card) 80'; Atencio (yellow card) 86'	Stadium: BMO Stadium; Attendance: 22,132; Referee: Victor Rivas

April 25 10	Minnesota United FC	0–1	Los Angeles FC	Saint Paul, Minnesota
1:45 PM	Yeboah (yellow card) 53'	Report	Martínez 9'; Tillman (yellow card) 52'; Hollingshead (yellow card) 86'; Palencia (yellow card) 90+5'	Stadium: Allianz Field; Attendance: 19,710; Referee: Guido Gonzales Jr.

=== May ===
May 2 11	San Diego FC	2–2	Los Angeles FC	San Diego, California
6:30 PM	Ingvartsen 7', 71'; Vazquez (yellow card) 15'; Pilcher (yellow card) 73'; Godoy (yellow card) 78'	Report	Nielsen (yellow card) 59'; Bouanga 82'; Hollingshead 90+14'	Stadium: Snapdragon Stadium; Attendance: 28,459; Referee: Filip Dujic

May 10 12	Los Angeles FC	1–4	Houston Dynamo FC	Los Angeles
6:00 PM	Ordaz 45'; Martínez (yellow card) 79'; Boyd (yellow card) 86'; Raposo (yellow card) 90+3'; Tafari (yellow card) 90+4'	Report	McGlynn 25', 55', (yellow card) 45+5'; Guilherme (yellow card) 27', (goal) 34'; Bogusz 51'; Andrade (yellow card) 88'	Stadium: BMO Stadium; Attendance: 21,531; Referee: Drew Fischer

May 13 13	St. Louis City SC	2–1	Los Angeles FC	St. Louis, Missouri
5:30 PM	Totland 4', (yellow card) 49'; Polvara (yellow card) 60'; Santos 64'; Becher (yellow card) 76'	Report	Segura (yellow card) 58'; Long (yellow card) 67'; Martínez 73'; Raposo (yellow card) 83'	Stadium: Energizer Park; Attendance: 22,423; Referee: Lorenzo Hernandez

May 17 14	Nashville SC	3–2	Los Angeles FC	Nashville, Tennessee
5:00 PM	Mukhtar 13', 21', 59'; Qasem (yellow card) 67'; Baker-Whiting (yellow card) 88'; Acosta (yellow card) 90+7'	Report	Martínez 22'; Porteous (yellow card) 58'; Bouanga 68'; Segura (yellow card) 76'	Stadium: Geodis Park; Attendance: 27,948; Referee: Rubiel Vazquez

May 24 15	Los Angeles FC	1–0	Seattle Sounders FC	Los Angeles
6:00 PM	Tillman 86'	Report		Stadium: BMO Stadium; Attendance: 22,146; Referee: Ramy Touchan

July

July 17 16	LA Galaxy	0–3	Los Angeles FC	Carson, California
7:30 PM	Cerrillo (yellow card) 34'; Glesnes (yellow card) 45+2'; Miller (yellow card) 80'	Report	Delgado 26'; Bouanga 45+1' (pen.); Son Heung-Min 57'	Stadium: Dignity Health Sports Park; Attendance: 24,325; Referee: Rubiel Vazquez

July 22 17	Los Angeles FC	3–1	Real Salt Lake	Los Angeles
7:30 PM	Son Heung-min 11'; Bouanga 40'; Yedlin 69' (o.g.)	Report	Engel 86'	Stadium: BMO Stadium; Attendance: 22,097; Referee: Pierre-Luc Lauziere

July 25 18	Los Angeles FC	4–0	Sporting Kansas City	Los Angeles
7:30 PM	Son Heung-min 5'; Bouanga 37', 85'; Martínez 45+4'	Report	García (yellow card) 2'; Harris (yellow card) 75'	Stadium: BMO Stadium; Attendance: 22,030; Referee: Ricardo Fierro

=== August ===
August 1 19	Vancouver Whitecaps FC	1–1	Los Angeles FC	Vancouver, British Columbia
4:30 PM	Gauld (yellow card) 56'; Müller 76' (pen.)	Report	Son Heung-min 37'; Hollingshead (yellow card) 48'	Stadium: BC Place; Attendance: 40,086; Referee: Elijio Arreguin

August 15 20	Los Angeles FC	0–1	San Diego FC	Los Angeles
7:30 PM	Segura (yellow card) 62'; Delgado (yellow card) 80'; Choinière (yellow card) 84'; Son Heung-Min (yellow card) 90+7'	Report	Alvarado (yellow card) 30'; Valakari (yellow card) 75'; Dreyer 89' (pen.), (yellow card) 90' (yellow-red card) 90+7'	Stadium: BMO Stadium; Attendance: 22,810; Referee: Ismail Elfath

August 19 21	Colorado Rapids	1–0	Los Angeles FC	Commerce City, Colorado
6:30 PM	Ebobisse 22' (o.g.); Maziz (yellow card) 32'; Yapi (yellow card) 56'; Thompson (yellow card) 88'	Report	Cheberko (yellow card) 21'; Segura (yellow card) 40'; Tafari (yellow card) 41'	Stadium: Dick's Sporting Goods Park; Attendance: 15,986; Referee: Joe Dickerson

August 22 22	Los Angeles FC	1–1	Portland Timbers	Los Angeles
7:30 PM	Choinière (yellow card) 16'; Bouanga 79', (yellow card) 87'	Report	Da Costa 4'; Kelsy (yellow card) 31'; Janssen (yellow card) 89' (red card) 90+3'	Stadium: BMO Stadium; Attendance: 22,246; Referee: Jon Freemon

August 29 23	D.C. United	0–0	Los Angeles FC	Washington, D.C.
4:30 PM		Report		Stadium: Audi Field; Attendance: 19,365; Referee: Sergii Demianchuk

=== September ===
September 5 24	Real Salt Lake	2–2	Los Angeles FC	Sandy, Utah
6:30 PM	Lobjanidze 18'; Arias (yellow card) 30'; Moisa (yellow card) 60'; Caliskan 75'; Guske (yellow card) 77'	Report	Bouanga 14'; Son Heung-min 38'	Stadium: America First Field; Attendance: 21,078; Referee: Allen Chapman

September 9 25	Los Angeles FC	2–0	New York Red Bulls	Los Angeles
7:30 PM	Terry 21'; Nielsen (yellow card) 42'; Raposo (yellow card) 87'; Sieb 90+6'	Report	Nealis (yellow card) 18'; Bazán (yellow card) 52'	Stadium: BMO Stadium; Attendance: 22,102; Referee: Ricardo Montero

September 12 26	Sporting Kansas City	3–1	Los Angeles FC	Kansas City, Kansas
5:30 PM	André Luiz 18'; Calheira 31'; Agyabeng (yellow card) 44'; Bartlett 71'; Harris (yellow card) 82'	Report	Palencia (yellow card) 19'; Bouanga 47'; Cheberko (yellow card) 80'	Stadium: Sporting Park; Attendance: 15,738; Referee: Chris Penso

September 19 27	San Jose Earthquakes	2–2	Los Angeles FC	Santa Clara, California
4:30 PM	Judd (yellow card) 66', (goal) 70'; Tsakiris (yellow card) 90+6'; Roberts 90+8'	Report	Son Heung-min 34'; Long (red card) 36'; Bouanga 53'; Delgado (yellow card) 73'; Palencia (yellow card) 76'	Stadium: Levi's Stadium; Attendance: 40,518; Referee: Drew Fischer

September 26 28	FC Dallas	1–0	Los Angeles FC	Frisco, Texas
5:30 PM	Urhoghide 34'; Johansson (yellow card) 71'; Norris (yellow card) 90+2'	Report	Sieb (yellow card) 24'; Porteous (yellow card) 44'; Delgado (yellow card) 84'; Raposo (yellow card) 90+3'	Stadium: Toyota Stadium; Attendance: 10,925; Referee: Sergii Boiko

=== October ===
October 10 29	Los Angeles FC	1–1	Vancouver Whitecaps FC	Los Angeles
7:30 PM	Choinière (yellow card) 25'; Bouanga 46'; Jesus (yellow card) 72'; Hollingshead (yellow card) 89'	Report	Blackmon (red card) 7'; Larraz 43'; Ocampo (yellow card) 76'; Laborda (yellow card) 90+2'	Stadium: BMO Stadium; Attendance: 22,287; Referee: Guido Gonzales Jr.

October 14 30	Los Angeles FC	3–1	Austin FC	Los Angeles
7:30 PM	Bouanga 52', 67'; Son Heung-min 72'	Report	Vázquez 66'	Stadium: BMO Stadium; Attendance: 22,180; Referee: Jair Marrufo

October 17 31	New York City FC	1–1	Los Angeles FC	New York, New York
4:30 PM	Wolf (yellow card) 28'; O'Neill (yellow card) 44'; Ojeda (yellow card) 54'; Perea 59'	Report	Walta 45+1'	Stadium: Citi Field; Attendance: 23,873; Referee: Rosendo Mendoza
Note: Match was originally rescheduled for November 4.

October 25 32	Los Angeles FC	2–2	LA Galaxy	Los Angeles
6:00 PM	Bouanga 53'; Porteous (yellow card) 55'; Walta 62'	Report	Paintsil 34', 51'; Ruiz (yellow card) 90+3'	Stadium: BMO Stadium; Attendance: 22,323; Referee: Armando Villarreal

=== November ===
November 1 33	Los Angeles FC	1–3	Minnesota United FC	Los Angeles
5:30 PM	Igor Jesus (yellow card) 45+1'; Segura (yellow card) 58'; Boyd (yellow card) 84'	Report	Pereyra 29', 81', (yellow card) 45+5'; Valerius 34'; Díaz (yellow card) 60'; Duggan (yellow card) 74'; Triantis (yellow card) 90+3'	Stadium: BMO Stadium; Attendance: 22,168; Referee: Joe Dickerson

November 7 34	Seattle Sounders FC	2–1	Los Angeles FC	Seattle, Washington
4:00 PM	Rusnák 2'; Gomez 31'; Ragen (yellow card) 76'; Kossa-Rienzi (yellow card) 90'; Kingston (yellow card) 90+3'	Report	Palencia (yellow card) 73'; Segura 81'	Stadium: Lumen Field; Attendance: 40,171; Referee: Filip Dujic

=== MLS Cup playoffs ===
November 23 Round one match 1	St. Louis City SC	v	Los Angeles FC	St. Louis, Missouri
5:00 PM				Stadium: Energizer Park

November 28 Round one match 2	Los Angeles FC	v	St. Louis City SC	Los Angeles
5:30 PM				Stadium: BMO Stadium

December 2 Round one match 3	St. Louis City SC	v	Los Angeles FC	St. Louis, Missouri
PM				Stadium: Energizer Park

=== CONCACAF Champions Cup ===
==== Round One ====
February 17 First leg	Real España (Honduras)	1–6	(United States) Los Angeles FC	San Pedro Sula, Honduras
7:00 PM PST	Jean-Baptiste 51'	Report	Bouanga 3' (pen.), 24', 71'; Martínez 11'; Son Heung-min 22' (pen.); Tillman 39'	Stadium: Estadio General Francisco Morazán; Attendance: 11,530; Referee: Marco Antonio Ortíz Nava (Mexico)

February 24 Second leg	Los Angeles FC (United States)	1–0 (7–1 agg.)	(Honduras) Real España	Los Angeles
7:00 PM PST	Tafari 64'	Report	Benavidez (yellow card) 51'; Tatum (yellow card) 69'	Stadium: BMO Stadium; Attendance: 7,972; Referee: Oshane Nation (Jamaica)
Note: Los Angeles FC won 7–1 on aggregate

==== Round of 16 ====
March 10 First leg	Los Angeles FC (United States)	1–1	(Costa Rica) Alajuelense	Los Angeles
8:00 PM PDT	Bouanga 56'	Report	Bran 44', (yellow card) 88'; van der Putten (yellow card) 90+2'	Stadium: BMO Stadium; Attendance: 11,275; Referee: Victor Cáceres (Mexico)

March 17 Second leg	Alajuelense (Costa Rica)	1–2 (2–3 agg.)	(United States) Los Angeles FC	Alajuela, Costa Rica
6:00 PM PDT	van der Putten 4'; Villalobos (yellow card) 17'; Pérez (yellow card) 33'; Salazar (yellow card) 50'	Report	Segura (yellow card) 32'; Bouanga (yellow card) 45'; Son Heung-min (yellow card) 50'; Ordaz 51'; Martínez 90+2'	Stadium: Estadio Alejandro Morera Soto; Attendance: 12,608; Referee: Marco Ortíz (Mexico)
Note: Los Angeles FC won 3–2 on aggregate.

==== Quarterfinals ====
April 7 First leg	Los Angeles FC (United States)	3–0	(Mexico) Cruz Azul	Los Angeles
7:00 PM PDT	Son Heung-min 30'; Martínez 39', 58'; Palencia (yellow card) 80'	Report	García (yellow card) 34'; Palavecino (yellow card) 61'; Rotondi (yellow card) 90+3'	Stadium: BMO Stadium; Attendance: 17,521; Referee: Keylor Herrera (Costa Rica)

April 14 Second leg	Cruz Azul (Mexico)	1–1 (1–4 agg.)	(United States) Los Angeles FC	Puebla, Mexico
6:00 PM PDT	Fernández (yellow card) 12', (goal) 18' (pen.); Palavecino (yellow card) 12'; Rodríguez (yellow card) 13'; Rotondi (yellow card) 13'; Paradela (yellow card) 79'; Piovi (red card) 90+2'	Report	Bouanga (yellow card) 12', (goal) 90+7' (pen.); Porteous (yellow card) 20'; Segura (yellow card) 41'	Stadium: Estadio Cuauhtémoc; Attendance: 24,965; Referee: Iván Barton (El Salvador)
Note: Los Angeles FC won 4–1 on aggregate.

==== Semifinals ====
April 29 First leg	Los Angeles FC (United States)	2–1	(Mexico) Toluca	Los Angeles
7:30 PM PDT	Tillman 51'; Porteous (yellow card) 69'; Tafari 90+1'; Shaffelburg (yellow card) 96'	Report	Angulo 73', (yellow card) 74'; Barbosa (yellow card) 90'	Stadium: BMO Stadium; Attendance: 20,593; Referee: Ismael Cornejo (El Salvador)

May 6 Second leg	Toluca (Mexico)	4–0 (5–2 agg.)	(United States) Los Angeles FC	Toluca, Mexico
6:30 PM PDT	Helinho 49'; López 58'; Castro (yellow card) 59'; Paulinho 90+2', 90+4'	Report	Porteous (yellow card) 38' (red card) 86'	Stadium: Estadio Nemesio Díez; Attendance: 27,273; Referee: Juan Gabriel Calderón (Costa Rica)
Note: Toluca won 5–2 on aggregate.

=== Leagues Cup ===
==== League phase ====
Pos	Team	Pld	W	PW	PL	L	GF	GA	GD	Pts	Qualification
1	Chicago Fire FC	3	3	0	0	0	7	2	+5	9	Advance to knockout stage
2	Austin FC	3	2	1	0	0	6	1	+5	8	Advance to knockout stage
3	Columbus Crew	3	2	1	0	0	6	3	+3	8	Advance to knockout stage
4	Real Salt Lake	3	2	0	1	0	8	1	+7	7	Advance to knockout stage
5	Los Angeles FC	3	1	2	0	0	3	2	+1	7	
6	Charlotte FC	3	2	0	0	1	5	1	+4	6	
7	Portland Timbers	3	2	0	0	1	9	6	+3	6	
8	FC Cincinnati	3	2	0	0	1	6	3	+3	6	
9	FC Dallas	3	2	0	0	1	4	3	+1	6	
10	San Diego FC	3	2	0	0	1	5	5	0	6	
11	Orlando City SC	3	1	1	0	1	5	5	0	5	
12	Minnesota United FC	3	1	0	1	1	4	3	+1	4	
13	Nashville SC	3	1	0	0	2	5	4	+1	3	
14	Inter Miami CF	3	1	0	0	2	7	7	0	3	
15	New York City FC	3	1	0	0	2	4	4	0	3	
16	Seattle Sounders FC	3	1	0	0	2	4	5	−1	3	
17	Philadelphia Union	3	1	0	0	2	3	4	−1	3	
18	Vancouver Whitecaps FC	3	0	0	1	2	2	5	−3	1	

Source: Leagues Cup

August 5 1	Los Angeles FC (United States)	1–1 (5–4 p)	(Mexico) Guadalajara	Los Angeles
7:30 PM PDT	Bouanga 38'; Porteous (yellow card) 82'	Report	González (yellow card) 13'; Alvarado 42'; Aguirre (yellow card) 80'	Stadium: BMO Stadium; Attendance: 22,132; Referee: César Ramos
	Penalties
	Bouanga (penalty scored); Boyd (penalty scored); Delgado (penalty missed); Choinière (penalty scored); Porteous (penalty scored); Terry (penalty scored)		(penalty missed) Castañeda; (penalty scored) Marín; (penalty scored) Alvarado; (penalty scored) Gutiérrez; (penalty scored) Rey; (penalty missed) Romo

August 8 2	Toluca (Mexico)	0–1	(United States) Los Angeles FC	Los Angeles
8:10 PM PDT	López (yellow card) 56'; Viñas (yellow card) 64'	Report	Martínez (yellow card) 30'; Segura 90+1'	Stadium: BMO Stadium; Attendance: 22,111; Referee: Víctor Cáceres

August 12 3	Los Angeles FC (United States)	1–1 (5–3 p)	(Mexico) Querétaro	Los Angeles
7:30 PM PDT	Bouanga 57'; Tillman (yellow card) 82'; Martínez (yellow card) 84'	Report	Ávila 12'; Homenchenko (yellow card) 76'; D. Parra (yellow card) 82'	Stadium: BMO Stadium; Attendance: 35,286; Referee: Filip Dujic
	Penalties
	Bouanga (penalty scored); Son Heung-min (penalty scored); Cheberko (penalty scored); Hollingshead (penalty scored); Porteous (penalty scored)		(penalty scored) Ávila; (penalty scored) Homenchenko; (penalty scored) Reyes; (penalty missed) Parra
