= 2023 Los Angeles FC 2 season =

American soccer team

LAFC2
2023 season
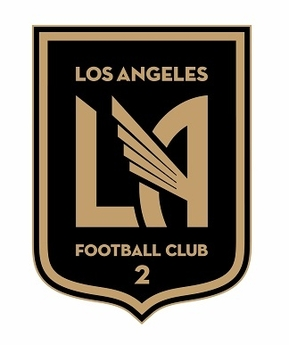
- Owner: Los Angeles FC
- Head coach: Enrique Duran
- Stadium: Titan Stadium; Fullerton, California
- MLS Next Pro: Western Conference: 13th Overall: 25th
Home colors	Away colors

Los Angeles FC 2 is an American professional soccer team that is located in the Greater Los Angeles, California area. It is the reserve team of Los Angeles FC and participates in MLS Next Pro.

== Regular season ==
During the regular season, teams played 28 matches each in a mostly regionalized schedule. Each conference was divided into divisions of seven or eight teams for scheduling.

== Team roster ==
MLS Next Pro allows for up to 35 players on a roster. Roster slots 1 through 24 are reserved for players on professional contracts. The remaining 11 slots are for amateur MLS Academy players (who are unpaid, must be under the age of 21, be part of the team's academy, and have never signed a professional contract or played in the NCAA).

=== Standings ===
Western Conference

Pos	Div	Team	Pld	W	SOW	SOL	L	GF	GA	GD	Pts	Qualification
1	FR	Colorado Rapids 2	28	19	4	1	4	70	37	+33	66	Qualification for the Conference semifinals
2	PC	Tacoma Defiance	28	14	6	3	5	54	33	+21	57	Qualification for the Playoffs
3	FR	Sporting Kansas City II	28	13	4	2	9	59	41	+18	49	Qualification for the Playoffs
4	FR	Austin FC II	28	12	4	5	7	40	23	+17	49	Qualification for the Playoffs
5	FR	St. Louis City 2	28	11	5	4	8	49	39	+10	47	Qualification for the Playoffs
6	PC	San Jose Earthquakes II	28	11	5	2	10	41	36	+5	45	Qualification for the Playoffs
7	FR	Houston Dynamo 2	28	12	3	1	12	50	44	+6	43	Qualification for the Playoffs
8	FR	Minnesota United FC 2	28	10	5	3	10	50	52	−2	43	
9	FR	North Texas SC	28	9	1	7	11	43	45	−2	36	
10	PC	Portland Timbers 2	28	11	0	1	16	40	63	−23	34	
11	PC	Whitecaps FC 2	28	8	3	4	13	33	46	−13	34	
12	PC	Real Monarchs	28	8	2	3	15	27	54	−27	31	
13	PC	Los Angeles FC 2	28	6	0	7	15	30	39	−9	25	
14	PC	LA Galaxy II	28	5	4	2	17	36	74	−38	25	

Source: MLSNP Western Conference
Rules for classification: 1) points; 2) total wins; 3) total goal differential; 4) total goals scored; 5) fewer disciplinary points; 6) away goal differential; 7) away goals scored; 8) home goals differential; 9) home goals scored; 10) coin toss (2 clubs tied) or drawing of lots (≥3 clubs tied)

Overall table

Pos	Team	Pld	W	SOW	SOL	L	GF	GA	GD	Pts	Awards
1	Colorado Rapids 2	28	19	4	1	4	70	37	+33	66	Regular season champion and U.S. Open Cup First Round
2	Crown Legacy FC	28	19	4	1	4	60	34	+26	66	U.S. Open Cup First Round
3	Tacoma Defiance	28	14	6	3	5	57	36	+21	57	
4	New England Revolution II	28	14	6	2	6	57	41	+16	56	
5	Columbus Crew 2	28	16	3	0	9	58	46	+12	54	
6	New York Red Bulls II	28	14	3	3	8	53	36	+17	51	U.S. Open Cup First Round
7	Sporting Kansas City II	28	13	4	2	9	60	42	+18	49	U.S. Open Cup First Round
8	Austin FC II	28	12	4	5	7	40	23	+17	49	
9	St. Louis City 2	28	11	5	4	8	49	39	+10	47	
10	Orlando City B	28	13	2	3	10	59	61	−2	46	
11	San Jose Earthquakes II	28	11	5	2	10	41	36	+5	45	
12	Houston Dynamo 2	28	12	3	1	12	50	44	+6	43	
13	Minnesota United FC 2	28	10	5	3	10	50	52	−2	43	U.S. Open Cup First Round
14	Chicago Fire FC II	28	9	5	6	8	54	46	+8	43	U.S. Open Cup First Round
15	Philadelphia Union II	28	12	2	2	12	54	57	−3	42	
16	New York City FC II	28	12	1	3	12	60	55	+5	41	U.S. Open Cup First Round
17	Huntsville City FC	28	9	4	3	12	48	45	+3	38	
18	North Texas SC	28	9	1	7	11	43	45	−2	36	
19	Atlanta United 2	28	9	2	4	13	50	52	−2	35	
20	Portland Timbers 2	28	11	0	1	16	40	63	−23	34	U.S. Open Cup First Round
21	Whitecaps FC 2	28	8	3	4	13	36	49	−13	34	
22	Real Monarchs	28	8	2	3	15	27	54	−27	31	
23	Toronto FC II	28	6	3	5	14	43	57	−14	29	
24	FC Cincinnati 2	28	7	2	2	17	37	65	−28	27	
25	Los Angeles FC 2	28	6	0	7	15	30	39	−9	25	
26	LA Galaxy II	28	5	4	2	17	36	74	−38	25	U.S. Open Cup First Round
27	Inter Miami CF II	28	5	1	5	17	34	68	−34	22	

Source: MLSNP
Rules for classification: 1) points; 2) total wins; 3) total goal differential; 4) total goals scored; 5) fewer disciplinary points; 6) away goal differential; 7) away goals scored; 8) home goals differential; 9) home goals scored; 10) coin toss (2 clubs tied) or drawing of lots (≥3 clubs tied)

==== Matches ====
1	Los Angeles FC 2	v	North Texas SC

2	Los Angeles FC 2	v (3-2 SO)	Whitecaps FC 2

3	Sporting Kansas City II	v	Los Angeles FC 2

4	Houston Dynamo 2	v (4-1 SO)	Los Angeles FC 2

5	Portland Timbers 2	v	Los Angeles FC 2

6	Los Angeles FC 2	v	The Town FC

7	Los Angeles FC 2	v (5-3 SO)	St. Louis City 2

8	Real Monarchs	v	Los Angeles FC 2

9	Tacoma Defiance	v (3-1 SO)	Los Angeles FC 2

10	Los Angeles FC 2	v	Houston Dynamo 2

11	Los Angeles FC 2	v	Colorado Rapids 2

12	Los Angeles FC 2	v	Sporting Kansas City II

13	Whitecaps FC 2	v	Los Angeles FC 2

14	North Texas SC	v (8-7 SO)	Los Angeles FC 2
				Attendance: 1,251

15	Los Angeles FC 2	v	The Town FC

16	Ventura County FC	v	Los Angeles FC 2

17	Minnesota United FC 2	v	Los Angeles FC 2

18	Los Angeles FC 2	v	Tacoma Defiance

19	St. Louis City 2	v	Los Angeles FC 2

20	Los Angeles FC 2	v (3-4 SO)	Austin FC II

21	Los Angeles FC 2	v	Minnesota United FC 2

22	Los Angeles FC 2	v	Ventura County FC

23	Colorado Rapids 2	v	Los Angeles FC 2

24	Los Angeles FC 2	v	Real Monarchs

25	Austin FC II	v (5-4 SO)	Los Angeles FC 2

26	Ventura County FC	v	Los Angeles FC 2

27	Los Angeles FC 2	v	Portland Timbers 2

28	The Town FC	v	Los Angeles FC 2
