= Luca Bombino =

American soccer player (born 2006)

Personal information
- Full name: Luca Dylan Bombino
- Date of birth: July 10, 2006 (age 20)
- Place of birth: Santa Monica, California, U.S.
- Height: 5 ft 9 in (1.75 m)
- Position: Left-back

Team information
- Current team: Stoke City
- Number: 21

Youth career
- 2012–2017: FC Valencia
- 2017–2023: Los Angeles FC

Senior career*
Years	Team	Apps	(Gls)
2023–2024	Los Angeles FC 2	32	(0)
2024–2025	Los Angeles FC	0	(0)
2025	→ San Diego FC (loan)	26	(1)
2026	San Diego FC	17	(1)
2026–	Stoke City	12	(0)

International career^{‡}
2023	United States U17	1	(0)
2024	United States U19	4	(0)
2025–	United States U20	11	(0)
- * Club domestic league appearances and goals as of 20:39, 21 November 2026 (UTC) ‡ National team caps and goals as of October 10, 2025

Luca Dylan Bombino (born July 10, 2006) is an American professional soccer player who plays left-back for EFL Championship club Stoke City.

== Career ==
=== Early career ===
Bombino was born in Santa Monica, California and participated in a community program called Kids Love Soccer in Santa Clarita. He then joined youth club FC Valencia until he was scouted playing in the state cup by Los Angeles FC joining in 2017 at under-12 level.

=== Los Angeles FC ===
Bombino played as part of the Los Angeles FC academy setup from 2017, before playing with the club's MLS Next Pro side Los Angeles FC 2 in both 2023 and 2024. On September 7, 2024, he was temporarily part of the first team squad, before signing permanently as a homegrown player a week later.

=== San Diego FC ===
On February 25, 2025, Bombino joined San Diego FC on a season-long loan ahead of their inaugural season. He scored his first professional goal on July 5, netting during a 4–3 loss at home to Houston Dynamo. On November 18, San Diego FC exercised their option to sign Bombino on a permanent basis. On April 11, 2026, Bombino scored San Diego's 100th goal.

=== Stoke City ===
On September 1, 2026, Bombino signed with EFL Championship club Stoke City for an undisclosed fee on a four-year contract. He made his debut the same day coming on as a half-time substitute in a 1–0 victory against Norwich City.

== International career ==
Born in the United States, Bombino is of Italian descent. Luca was named as an alternate for the 2023 FIFA U-17 World Cup, but did not make the final 21 man roster. He was called up to the United States U20s for the 2024 CONCACAF U-20 Championship. Bombino was part of the squad at the 2025 FIFA U-20 World Cup that took place in Chile.

== Career statistics ==
As of match played November 21, 2026

Appearances and goals by club, season and competition
Club	Season	League			National cup (Note: Includes U.S. Open Cup and FA Cup)		League cup (Note: Includes EFL Cup)		Other		Total	
Club	Season	Division	Apps	Goals	Apps	Goals	Apps	Goals	Apps	Goals	Apps	Goals
Los Angeles FC 2	2023	MLS Next Pro	17	0	—		—		—		17	0
Los Angeles FC 2	2024	MLS Next Pro	15	0	—		—		—		15	0
Los Angeles FC 2	Total		32	0	—		—		—		32	0
Los Angeles FC	2024	Major League Soccer	0	0	0	0	—		0	0	0	0
San Diego FC (loan)	2025	Major League Soccer	26	1	0	0	—		7 (Note: Two appearances in Leagues Cup and three appearances in MLS Cup playoffs)	1	31	2
San Diego FC	2026	Major League Soccer	17	1	0	0	—		6 (Note: Two appearances and one goal in Leagues Cup and four appearances and one goal in CONCACAF Champions Cup)	2	23	3
San Diego FC	Total		43	2	0	0	—		13	2	56	5
Stoke City	2026–27	EFL Championship	12	0	0	0	0	0	—		12	0
Career total			87	2	0	0	0	0	13	2	100	5
