= Nathan Ordaz =

American footballer (born 2004)

Personal information
- Full name: Nathan Rafael Ordaz
- Date of birth: January 12, 2004 (age 22)
- Place of birth: Van Nuys, California, U.S.
- Height: 5 ft 11 in (1.80 m)
- Position: Forward

Team information
- Current team: D.C. United

Youth career
- 2010–2016: Real So Cal
- 2016–2022: Los Angeles FC

Senior career*
Years	Team	Apps	(Gls)
2022–2026	Los Angeles FC	69	(8)
2022	→ Las Vegas Lights (loan)	17	(0)
2023–2024	Los Angeles FC 2	18	(4)
2026–	D.C. United	7	(0)

International career^{‡}
2022	El Salvador U20	5	(0)
2024–	El Salvador	14	(2)
- * Club domestic league appearances and goals as of 12 July 2026 ‡ National team caps and goals as of 6 June 2026

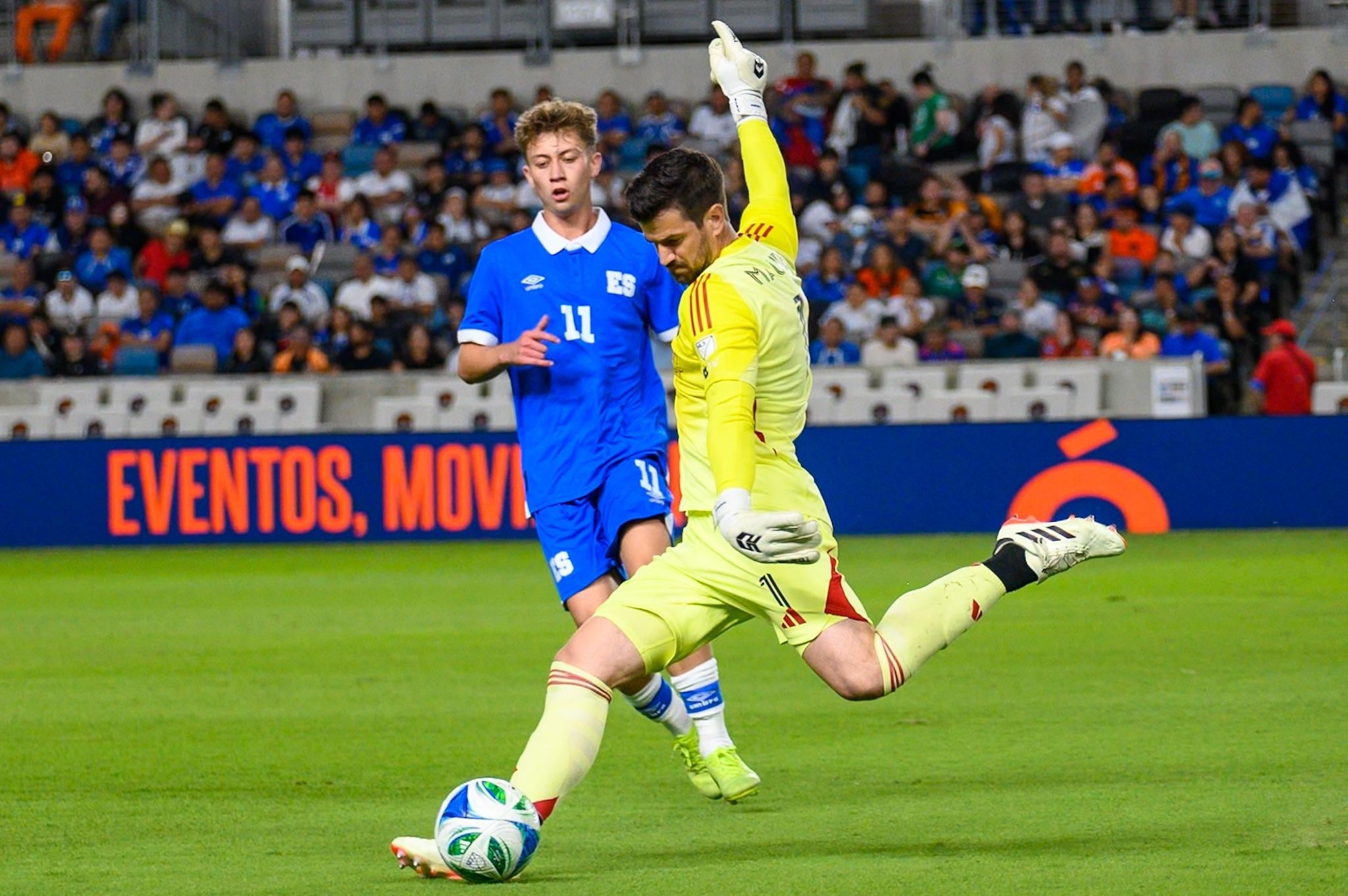
Houston Dynamo friendly vs El Salvador in Houston, Texas

Nathan Rafael Ordaz (born January 12, 2004) is a professional footballer who plays as a forward for Major League Soccer club D.C. United. Born in the United States, he represents the El Salvador national team.

== Early life ==
Ordaz was born on January 12, 2004, in the Van Nuys neighborhood of Los Angeles, California, into a middle-class household. His mother is Salvadoran and his father is Mexican, and he was raised in the nearby San Fernando Valley neighborhood of Encino.

== Club career ==
Ordaz signed with the Los Angeles FC academy in 2018, after previously competing with club side Real So Cal. He competed with Los Angeles FC Academy in the UPSL in 2021. On 22 April 2022, Ordaz signed a Homegrown Player contract with Los Angeles FC on a contract until 2025. Ordaz was loaned to LAFC's USL Championship affiliate Las Vegas Lights for the 2022 season.

On 13 July 2026, Ordaz was transferred to D.C. United in exchange for $2.375 million, and potentially another $500,000 in add-ons alongside a percentage of any future transfer.

== International career ==
Ordaz is eligible to play for the United States, El Salvador, or Mexico. He has represented El Salvador at under-19 in 2021, joining the U-19 team in training camp and playing with the team at the Dallas Cup. He also earned five caps for the under-20 team. In May 2022, Ordaz committed to representing Mexico at international level, and was included in the preliminary roster for the 2022 CONCACAF U-20 Championship.

=== El Salvador ===
In 2024, Ordaz accepted a call-up to the El Salvador national team.

Ordaz was not called up to the El Salvador squad for the CONCACAF Gold Cup due to Los Angeles FC qualifying for the 2025 FIFA Club World Cup.

== Personal life ==
In October 2025, Ordaz announced his engagement in a TikTok video.

== Career statistics ==
=== Club ===
As of match played 25 May 2026

Appearances and goals by club, season and competition
Club	Season	League			U.S. Open Cup		Continental		Other		Total	
Club	Season	Division	Apps	Goals	Apps	Goals	Apps	Goals	Apps	Goals	Apps	Goals
Las Vegas Lights (loan)	2022	USL Championship	17	0	—		—		—		17	0
Los Angeles FC 2	2023	MLS Next Pro	10	2	—		—		—		10	2
Los Angeles FC 2	2024	MLS Next Pro	7	2	—		—		—		7	2
Los Angeles FC 2	Total		17	4	—		—		—		17	4
Los Angeles FC	2023	MLS	19	0	2	0	–		3 (Note: Appearances in Leagues Cup)	2	24	2
Los Angeles FC	2024	MLS	13	1	3	0	–		2	0	18	1
Los Angeles FC	2025	MLS	26	5	–		5 (Note: Appearances in CONCACAF Champions Cup)	2	7 (Note: Two appearances in FIFA Club World Cup, two appearances in Leagues Cup, three appearances and one goal in MLS Cup playoffs)	1	38	8
Los Angeles FC	2026	MLS	9	2	–		5	1	0	0	14	3
Los Angeles FC	Total		67	8	5	0	10	3	12	3	94	14
Career total			101	13	5	0	10	3	12	3	128	18

=== International ===
List of international goals scored by Nathan Ordaz
No.	Date	Venue	Opponent	Score	Result	Competition
1	26 March 2026	Estadio Cibao FC, Santiago de los Caballeros, Dominican Republic	Dominican Republic	1–1	2–2	2025–26 CONCACAF Series
2	26 March 2026	Estadio Cibao FC, Santiago de los Caballeros, Dominican Republic	Dominican Republic	2–1	2–2	2025–26 CONCACAF Series
