= David Martínez (footballer, born 2006) =

Venezuelan footballer (born 2006)

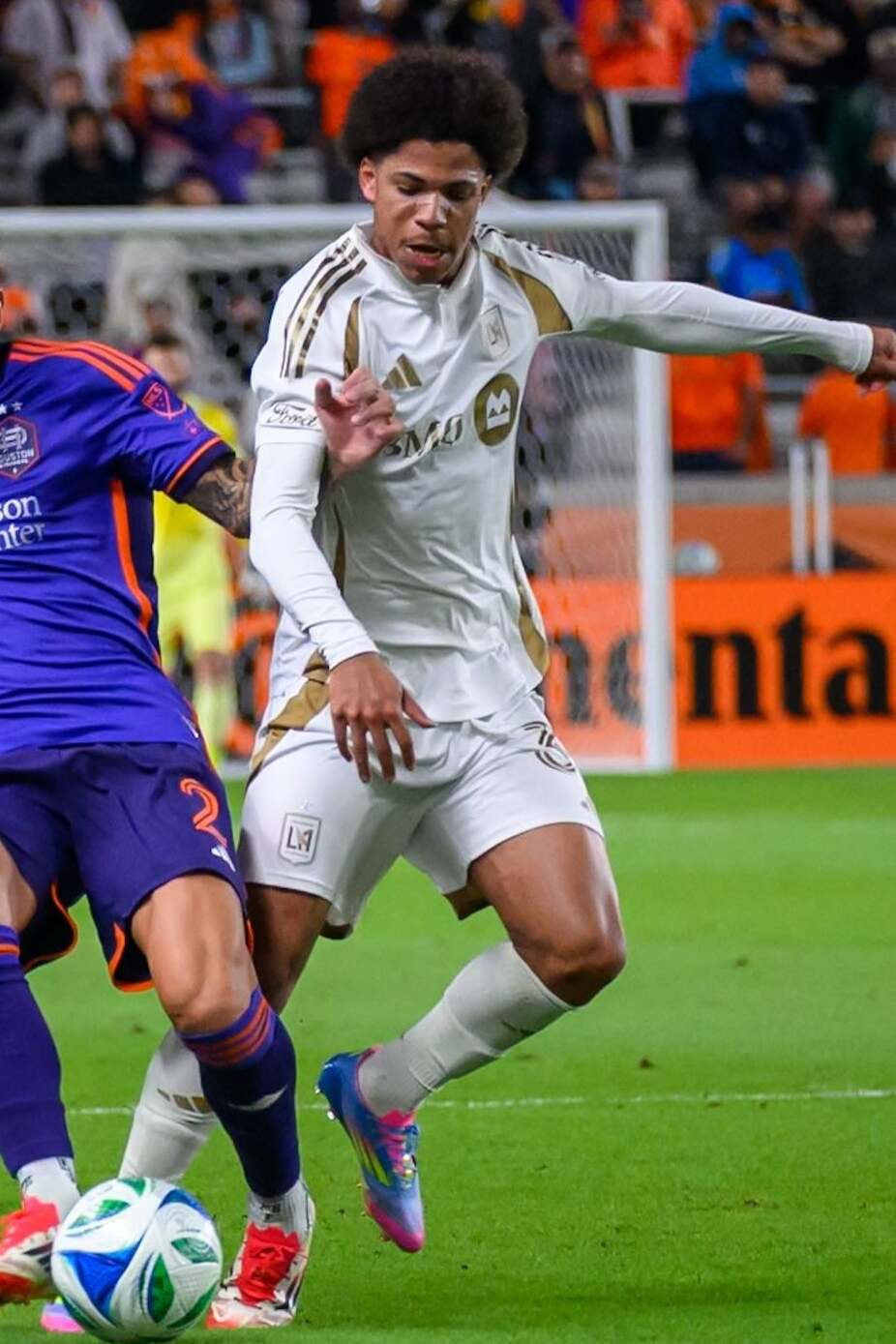
- Martínez with Los Angeles FC in 2025

Personal information
- Full name: David Emmanuel Martínez Morales
- Date of birth: 7 February 2006 (age 20)
- Place of birth: El Tigre, Venezuela
- Height: 1.78 m (5 ft 10 in)
- Position: Forward

Team information
- Current team: Midtjylland
- Number: 98

Youth career
- Monagas

Senior career*
Years	Team	Apps	(Gls)
2022–2024	Monagas	34	(5)
2024–2026	Los Angeles FC	64	(13)
2026–	Midtjylland	3	(0)

International career^{‡}
2023	Venezuela U17	13	(8)
2023	Venezuela U20	8	(0)
2024	Venezuela U23	7	(0)
2023–	Venezuela	7	(0)
Medal record
Representing Venezuela
Men's football
FIFA Series
Runner-up	2026 Uzbekistan
- * Club domestic league appearances and goals as of 20:04, 11 October 2026 (UTC) ‡ National team caps and goals as of 22:00, 9 June 2026 (UTC)

David Emmanuel Martínez Morales (born 7 February 2006) is a Venezuelan footballer who plays as a forward for Danish Superliga club Midtjylland and the Venezuela national team.

== Early life ==
Martínez was born in El Tigre in the state of Anzoátegui, but was raised in San José de Guanipa, also in Anzoátegui, but closer to the state of Monagas.

== Club career ==
Martínez featured for Tigre in a youth tournament in Puerto Ordaz, where he played against the 2005 category of professional side Monagas, despite being a year younger. These performances caught the eye of the Venezuelan Football Federation's technical director of development, Daniel Cesca, and contact was made with Tigre in 2017, with Martínez beginning to train with Monagas two times a week, while officially representing Tigre. He went on to join Monagas permanently the following year.

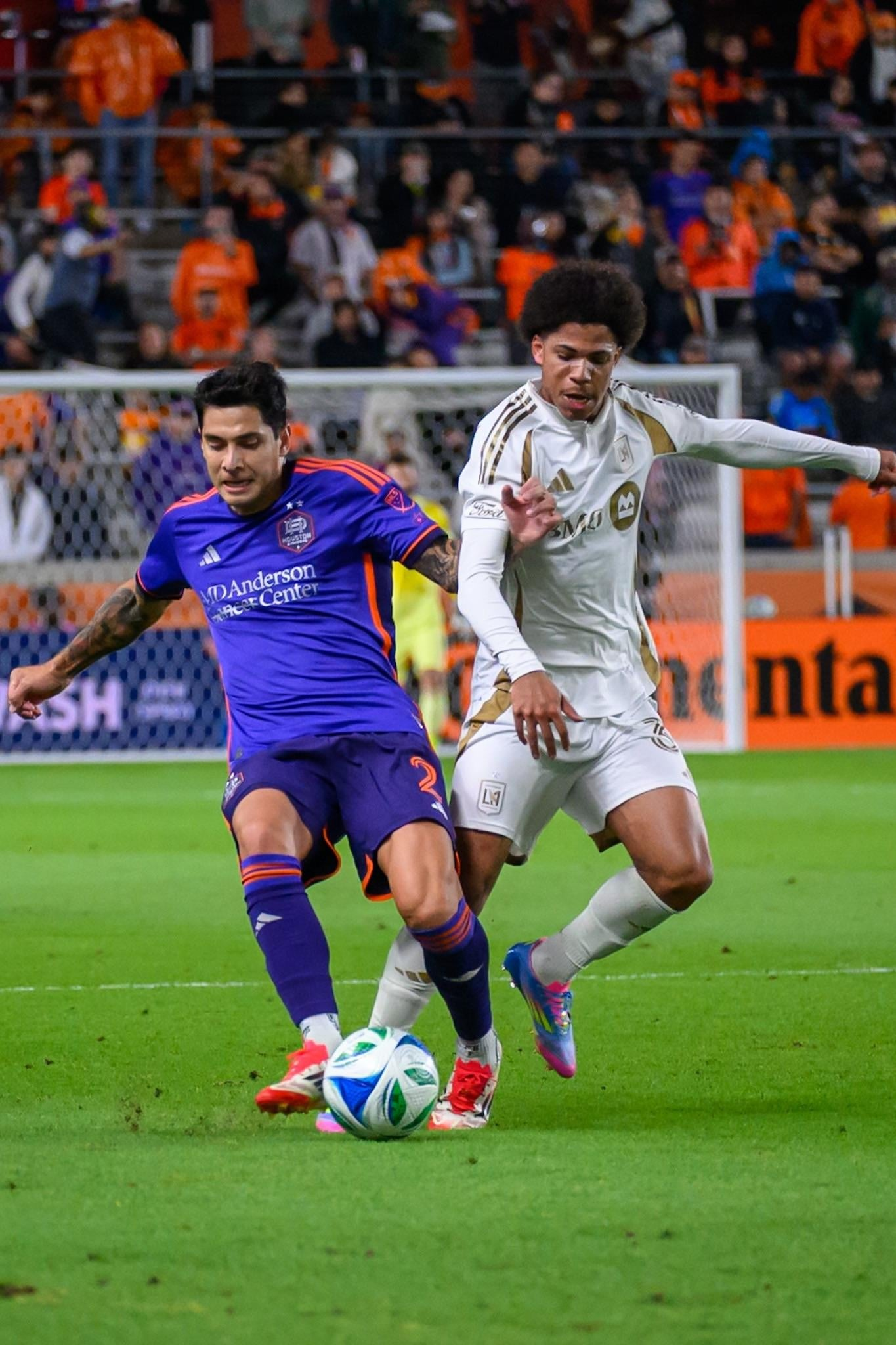
David Martinez (Right) playing for LAFC in April 2025 vs Houston Dynamo.

Having progressed through Monagas' academy, Martínez made his league debut in the 2022 season, coming on as a second-half substitute for Edgar Carrión in a 3–1 win against Mineros de Guayana. In only his fifth game for the club, he scored a long-range effort in a 2–0 win against Zulia.

On 11 October 2023, Martínez was named by English newspaper The Guardian as one of the best players born in 2006 worldwide. On 1 February 2024, Martínez joined Los Angeles FC in Major League Soccer.

On 1 September 2026, he joined FC Midtjylland in 3F Superliga. The transfer fee was reportedly €7.3 million, a record fee in the Danish Superliga.

== International career ==
In January 2023, he was called up to the Venezuela under-20 squad for the 2023 South American U-20 Championship, where Venezuela finished fifth.

Martínez was called up to captain the Venezuela under-17 squad at the 2023 South American U-17 Championship. He starred at the competition, scoring in Venezuela's first three games, before going on to score in a 2–0 win against Paraguay in the final phase to send Venezuela to the 2023 FIFA U-17 World Cup. For his performances, he was lauded as Venezuela's star player at the tournament. Martinez has also played for the Venezuela under-23 football team.

He was called up to the Venezuela senior squad for the first time in April 2022.

== Personal life ==
Martínez' brother, Estéban, is also a professional footballer, and currently plays as a defender for Monagas.

== Career statistics ==
=== Club ===
As of match played 15 October 2026

Appearances and goals by club, season and competition
Club	Season	League			National cup (Note: Includes U.S. Open Cup)		Continental		Other		Total		
Club	Season	Division	Apps	Goals	Apps	Goals	Apps	Goals	Apps	Goals	Apps	Goals	
Monagas	2022	Liga FUTVE	26	4	0	0	2 (Note: Appearances in Copa Libertadores)	0	—		28	4	
Monagas	2023	Liga FUTVE	8	1	0	0	3	1	—		11	2	
Monagas	Total		34	5	0	0	5	1	—		39	6	
Los Angeles FC	2024	MLS	17	4	1	1	—		7 (Note: Five appearances in Leagues Cup, two appearances in MLS Cup playoffs)	0	25	5	
Los Angeles FC	2025	MLS	29	3	—		5 (Note: Appearances in CONCACAF Champions Cup)	0	6 (Note: Three appearances in FIFA Club World Cup, three appearances in Leagues Cup)	0	40	3	
Los Angeles FC	2026	MLS	18	6	—		8	4	3 (Note: Appearances in Leagues Cup)	0	29	10	
Los Angeles FC	Total		64	13	1	1	13	4	16	0	94	18	
FC Midtjylland	2026–27	Danish Superliga	3	0	1	0	0	1 (Note: Appearances in UEFA Conference League)	0	—		5	0
Career total			101	18	2	1	18	5	17	0	138	24	

=== International ===
As of match played 9 June 2026

Appearances and goals by national team and year
National team	Year	Apps	Goals
Venezuela	2023	1	0
Venezuela	2025	3	0
Venezuela	2026	3	0
Total		7	0

== Honours ==
Venezuela

- FIFA Series runner-up: 2026

Individual

- CONCACAF Champions Cup Best Young Player: 2026
- CONCACAF Champions Cup Best XI: 2026
