= Junior Gonzalez (soccer) =

American soccer player and coach

Personal information
- Full name: Othoniel "Junior" Gonzalez
- Date of birth: September 26, 1977 (age 49)

College career
| Years | Team | Apps | (Gls) |
| 1995–1998 | UCLA Bruins | | |

Managerial career
- 2001–2003: UC Riverside Highlanders (assistant)
- 2004–2013: UC Riverside Highlanders
- 2013–2014: Chivas USA (assistant)
- 2015: United States U15 (assistant)
- 2016: Seattle Sounders FC 2 (assistant)
- 2017: Rio Grande Valley FC Toros
- 2018–2019: LA Galaxy (assistant)
- 2019: LA Galaxy II (interim)
- 2019–2021: LA Galaxy II
- 2022–2023: Chicago Fire (assistant)
- 2024–2025: Los Angeles FC 2
- 2026–: El Paso Locomotive FC

Othoniel "Junior" Gonzalez (born September 26, 1977) is an American professional soccer coach for 2nd-tier USL Championship-side El Paso Locomotive FC. He was previously the head coach for MLS Next Pro-side Los Angeles FC 2, assistant coach for Chicago Fire FC, and also had coaching positions with LA Galaxy II, Seattle Sounders FC, Chivas USA and was head coach with Rio Grande Valley FC Toros. Junior attended UCLA, where he played on the Men's NCAA soccer team and won the NCAA Division I Men's Soccer Championship in 1997.

Gonzalez's coaching career began in 2001 as an assistant coach for the University of California, Riverside men's program. Three years later he became the head coach and under his tenure 30 players were named All-Big West Conference – including two Big West Conference Players of the Year – and six players went on to MLS and USL careers. In 2011, Gonzalez was named the Big West Coach of the Year.

As a player, Gonzalez won the 1997 NCAA National Championship with UCLA. His collegiate career included four trips to the NCAA tournament and three Mountain Pacific Conference Championships. Gonzalez continued his playing career with the USL's San Diego Flash and his career continued throughout California before his final stop with the Utah Blitz.

During 2019, Gonzalez was the interim manager for LA Galaxy II.

On December 29, 2025, El Paso Locomotive FC named Gonzalez head coach for the 2026 USL Championship season.
