= Ethan Scally =

Japanese footballer (born 2008)

Ethan Scally 村松秀司
Personal information
- Full name: Ethan Scally
- Date of birth: 8 June 2008 (age 18)
- Place of birth: Los Angeles, California, United States
- Height: 1.87 m (6 ft 2 in)
- Position: Goalkeeper

Team information
- Current team: Los Angeles FC 2
- Number: 41

Youth career
- Los Angeles FC

College career
Years	Team	Apps	(Gls)
2026	Cornell Big Red		

Senior career*
Years	Team	Apps	(Gls)
2024–	Los Angeles FC 2	18	(0)
2026–	Los Angeles FC	0	(0)

International career^{‡}
2025	Japan U17	10	(0)
2026–	Japan U19	2	(0)
2026–	Japan U20	3	(0)
- * Club domestic league appearances and goals as of 9 November 2026 ‡ National team caps and goals as of 6 September 2026

Ethan Scally (村松秀司, Muramatsu Shuji; born Shuji Muramatsu on 8 June 2008) is a professional footballer who plays as a goalkeeper for MLS Next Pro club Los Angeles FC 2. Born in the United States, he represents Japan at youth level.

== Early life ==
Scally was born on 8 June 2008 in Los Angeles, California, United States. A native of the city, he is the son of a Japanese mother and an American father. Growing up, he played American football.

== Club career ==
As a youth player, Scally joined the youth academy of American side Los Angeles FC. In 2024, he was promoted to the club's reserve team.

== International career ==
In August 2022, Scally received his first call-up to the United States under-15 national football team for training. However, he did not play in any matches.

Scally is a Japan youth international. During April 2025, he played for the Japan national under-17 football team at the 2025 AFC U-20 Asian Cup. He was also in the Japanese squad for the 2025 FIFA U-20 World Cup.

== Career statistics ==
=== Club ===
As of match played 9 November 2026

Appearances and goals by club, season and competition
Club	Season	League			National cup (Note: Includes U.S. Open Cup)		League cup		Continental		Other		Total	
Club	Season	Division	Apps	Goals	Apps	Goals	Apps	Goals	Apps	Goals	Apps	Goals	Apps	Goals
Los Angeles FC 2	2025	MLS Next Pro	2	0	—		—		—		—		2	0
Los Angeles FC 2	2026	MLS Next Pro	16	0	—		—		—		—		16	0
Los Angeles FC 2	Los Angeles FC 2 total		18	0	0	0	0	0	0	0	0	0	18	0
Career total			18	0	0	0	0	0	0	0	0	0	18	0
