= Amin Boudri =

Swedish footballer (born 2004

Personal information
- Date of birth: 29 September 2004 (age 22)
- Place of birth: Hässelby, Stockholm,[Sweden
- Height: 1.76 m (5 ft 9 in)
- Position: Central midfielder

Team information
- Current team: Hammarby
- Number: 17

Youth career
- Hässelby SK
- IF Brommapojkarna
- –2021: AIK
- 2021–2023: Venezia

Senior career*
Years	Team	Apps	(Gls)
2024–2026	GAIS	48	(8)
2026	Los Angeles FC	4	(0)
2026–	Hammarby	6	(0)

International career^{‡}
2024	Sweden U19	2	(0)
2024–2025	Sweden U21	9	(1)
- * Club domestic league appearances and goals as of 21:06, 22 September 2026 (UTC) ‡ National team caps and goals as of 18:37, 18 November 2025 (UTC)

Amin Boudri (أمين بودري, Moroccan Arabic: [aˈmiːn buˈdri]; born 29 September 2004) is a Swedish professional footballer who plays as a central midfielder for Allsvenskan club Hammarby.

== Early life ==
Boudri was born on 29 September 2004 in Sweden. Of Moroccan descent through his parents, he is a native of Hässelby, Sweden.

== Club career ==
As a youth player, Boudri joined the academy of Swedish side AIK. In 2021, he joined the academy of Italian side Venezia at the age of sixteen. Swedish news website Fotbollskanalen.se wrote in 2024 that he "got the chance to train with Venezia's senior team regularly. He got to play in a few pre-season matches and in the Coppa Italia - but never made a league debut [for the senior team]" while playing for the club.

=== GAIS ===
Ahead of the 2024 season, he signed for Swedish side GAIS. On 18 February 2024, he debuted for the club during a 0–2 away loss to Elfsborg in the Svenska Cupen.

=== Los Angeles FC ===
On 24 January 2026, Boudri joined Major League Soccer club Los Angeles FC through the 2029 season, with and option to extend to 2030. Boudri made his MLS debut on 28 February 2026 in a 2–0 win over Houston Dynamo FC.

== International career ==
Boudri is a Sweden youth international. On 14 November 2024, he debuted for the Sweden national under-21 team during a 2–0 friendly away win over the Republic of Ireland.
