= Enrique Duran =

Spanish football coach (born 1981)

Personal information
- Full name: Enrique Durán Díaz
- Date of birth: 9 June 1981 (age 45)
- Place of birth: Barcelona, Spain

Managerial career
- Years: Team
- 2005–2011: FC Barcelona (youth)
- 2011–2015: Mamelodi Sundowns (technical director)
- 2017–2021: Los Angeles FC (academy)
- 2021–2022: Las Vegas Lights (assistant)
- 2022: Las Vegas Lights
- 2023: Los Angeles FC 2
- 2024–2026: Los Angeles FC (assistant)

Enrique Durán Díaz (born 9 June 1981) is a Spanish professional football manager.

== Coaching career ==
=== Barcelona ===
Durán was born on 9 June 1981 in Barcelona and began coaching FC Barcelona youth teams in 2005. He continued with FCB Escola, leading workshops in Saudi Arabia, China, England, Ireland, Bangladesh, Korea and Japan.

=== Mamelodi Sundowns ===
In 2011, he became Technical Director at South African club, Mamelodi Sundowns, where he played a key role in developing youth players such as Keagan Dolly and Lunathi Mdatyulwa.

Durán returned to Spain in 2015 to complete his master's degree at The Cruyff Institute. He subsequently joined Cruyff Football as a project manager, promoting the Cruyff brand and methodology.

=== Los Angeles FC Academy ===
In 2017, Durán was appointed Director of Coaching at Los Angeles FC Academy where he led the team 2018 CONCACAF Under-13 Champions League and Manchester City Cup.

=== Las Vegas Lights FC ===
Durán initially worked as an assistant to Head Coach Steve Cherundolo before being named as the head coach for the Las Vegas Lights FC ahead of the 2022 USL Championship season. His first game in charge was a 2–0 loss to New Mexico United.

=== Los Angeles FC 2 ===
On 25 January 2023, Durán was announced as the inaugural head coach of new MLS Next Pro side Los Angeles FC 2.

=== Los Angeles FC ===
On 20 December 2023, it was announced that Durán would join the coaching staff of Los Angeles FC as an assistant coach for the 2024 season.In October 2026 LAFC announced Durán would be leaving to pursue other opportunities, ending his ten year affiliation with the club.
