= Marius Aiyenero =

Canadian soccer player (born 2008)

Personal information
- Full name: Marius Omotoye Aiyenero
- Date of birth: May 23, 2008 (age 18)
- Place of birth: Middleton, Wisconsin, US
- Height: 1.85 m (6 ft 1 in)
- Position: Striker

Team information
- Current team: Los Angeles FC 2
- Number: 47

Youth career
- Chicago Fire
- 2023–2024: Torcy

Senior career*
Years	Team	Apps	(Gls)
2024–	Los Angeles FC 2	30	(4)
2026	→ Los Angeles FC (loan)	1	(0)

International career^{‡}
2023	United States U15	3	(0)
2024–2025	Canada U17	9	(6)
2026–	Canada U20	9	(1)
2026	Canada B	1	(0)
- * Club domestic league appearances and goals as of September 26, 2026 ‡ National team caps and goals as of August 8, 2026

Marius Omotoye Aiyenero (born May 23, 2008) is a professional soccer player who plays as a striker for MLS Next Pro club Los Angeles FC 2. Born in the United States, he is a youth international for Canada.

== Club career ==
Aiyenero is a product of the American club Chicago Fire before moving to the French club Torcy to finish his development. On 10 May 2024, he signed his first professional contract with Los Angeles FC 2. He was named to Los Angeles FC 2's squad for the 2025 season in the MLS Next Pro on March 12, 2025. In February 2026, he signed a short-term loan with the Los Angeles FC first team.

== International career ==
Aiyenero was born in the United States to a Nigerian-Canadian father, and an American mother. He was called up to the United States U15s for a set of friendlies in 2023. He played for the Canada U17s for the 2025 FIFA U-17 World Cup. On 6 January 2026, he was called up to the Canada national team for a training camp and friendly match against Guatemala, initially as a training player only. He debuted with Canada as a substitute in a 1–0 win over Guatemala on 17 January 2026, in an B-level friendly that did not count as an official cap.
