= Titan Stadium (Cal State Fullerton) =

Multi-purpose stadium at Cal State Fullerton

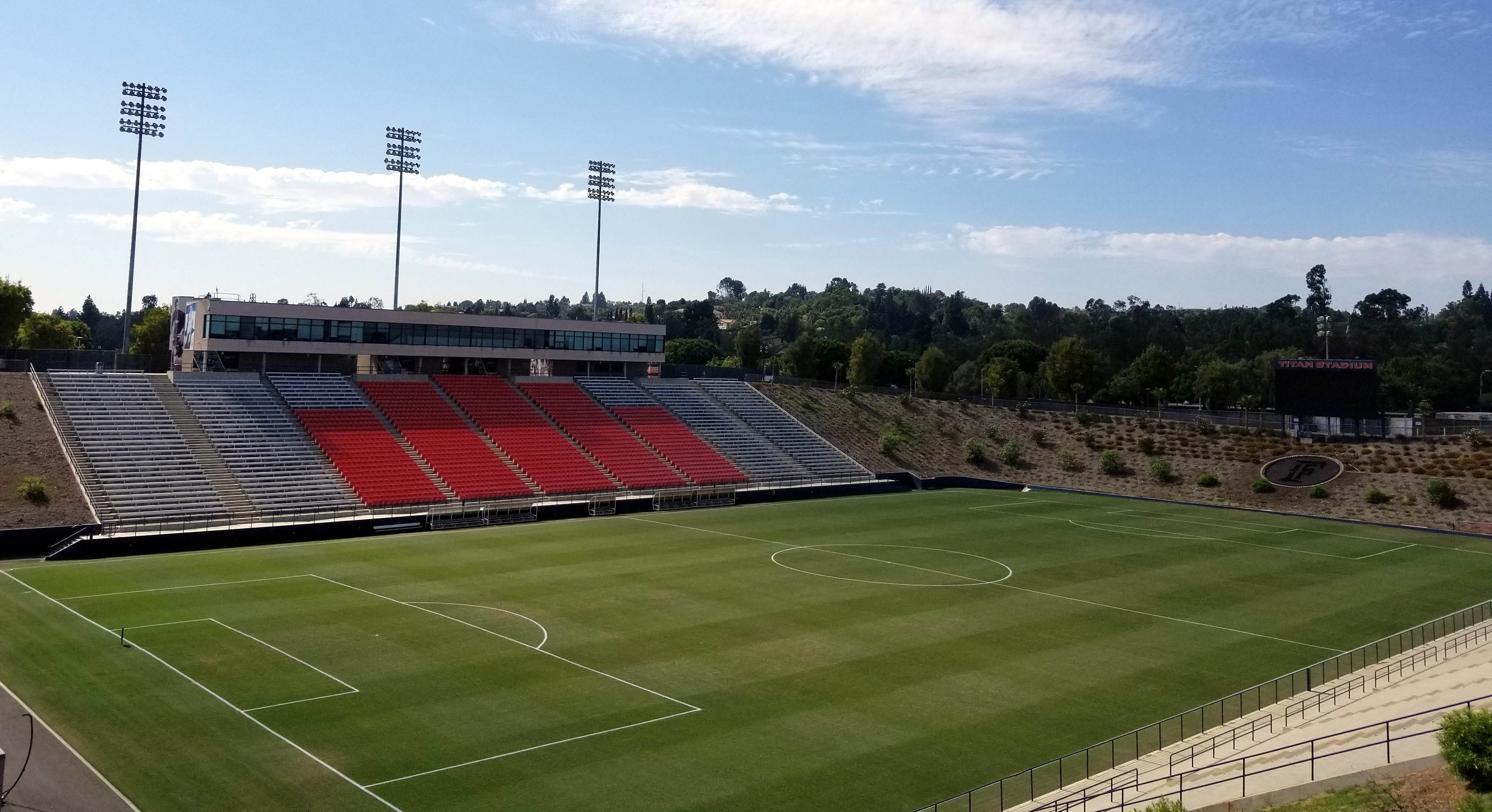
- View of the stadium in 2019
- Interactive map of Titan Stadium
- Address: Fullerton, CA; United States
- Coordinates: 33.886646°N 117.886992°W
- Owner: Cal State University
- Operator: Cal State Univ. Athletics
- Capacity: 10,000
- Executive suites: No
- Surface: Natural grass
- Scoreboard: Yes
- Field size: 75x120 yards

Construction
- Opened: 1992; 34 years ago
- Cost: $10.2 million

Tenants
- Cal State Fullerton Titans (NCAA) teams: Men's soccer (1992–present); Women's soccer (1993–present); Football (1992); Professional teams: Los Angeles FC 2 (MLSNP) 2023−present; Angel City FC (NWSL) 2022; Los Angeles Blues (USL Pro) 2011–2013; Los Angeles Salsa (APSL) 1993–1994

Titan Stadium is a stadium located on the campus of California State University, Fullerton in Fullerton, California.

It is the home venue for the Cal State Fullerton Titans men's and women's soccer teams, and professional Los Angeles FC 2 of MLSNP. It is formerly the home stadium of the CSUF football team.

Other soccer clubs from Los Angeles that have played their home matches at Titan Stadium include LA Galaxy (MLS) and Angel City FC (NWSL), among other teams.

== History ==
Scheduled to open in time for the 1991 football season, delays caused the opening date of Titan Stadium to be pushed back until 1992. Despite originally being planned as the home stadium for the Cal State Fullerton Titans football program, the delays in stadium construction put in question the possibility of the team actually taking the field.

Budget cuts and strict NCAA regulations eventually signaled the end of the football program in 1992 after playing one season at the stadium. Titan Stadium was designed to host the football team.

== Amenities ==
Titan Stadium has 2,000 chairback seats and 2,500 bleachers seats with backrests on the western side of the stadium. In addition, there are concrete steps on the opposite side which can hold nearly 5,000 extra people. The pitch features an underground drainage system that allows it to be almost perfectly flat. The main press box seats over 50 people and features 10 separate booths used for broadcasting, hospitality, etc.

== Tenants ==
=== CSUF Titans ===
The stadium is home to the CSUF Titans men's soccer and CSUF Titans women's soccer teams.

The Cal State Fullerton Titans football team played at the stadium in 1992.

=== Other teams and events ===
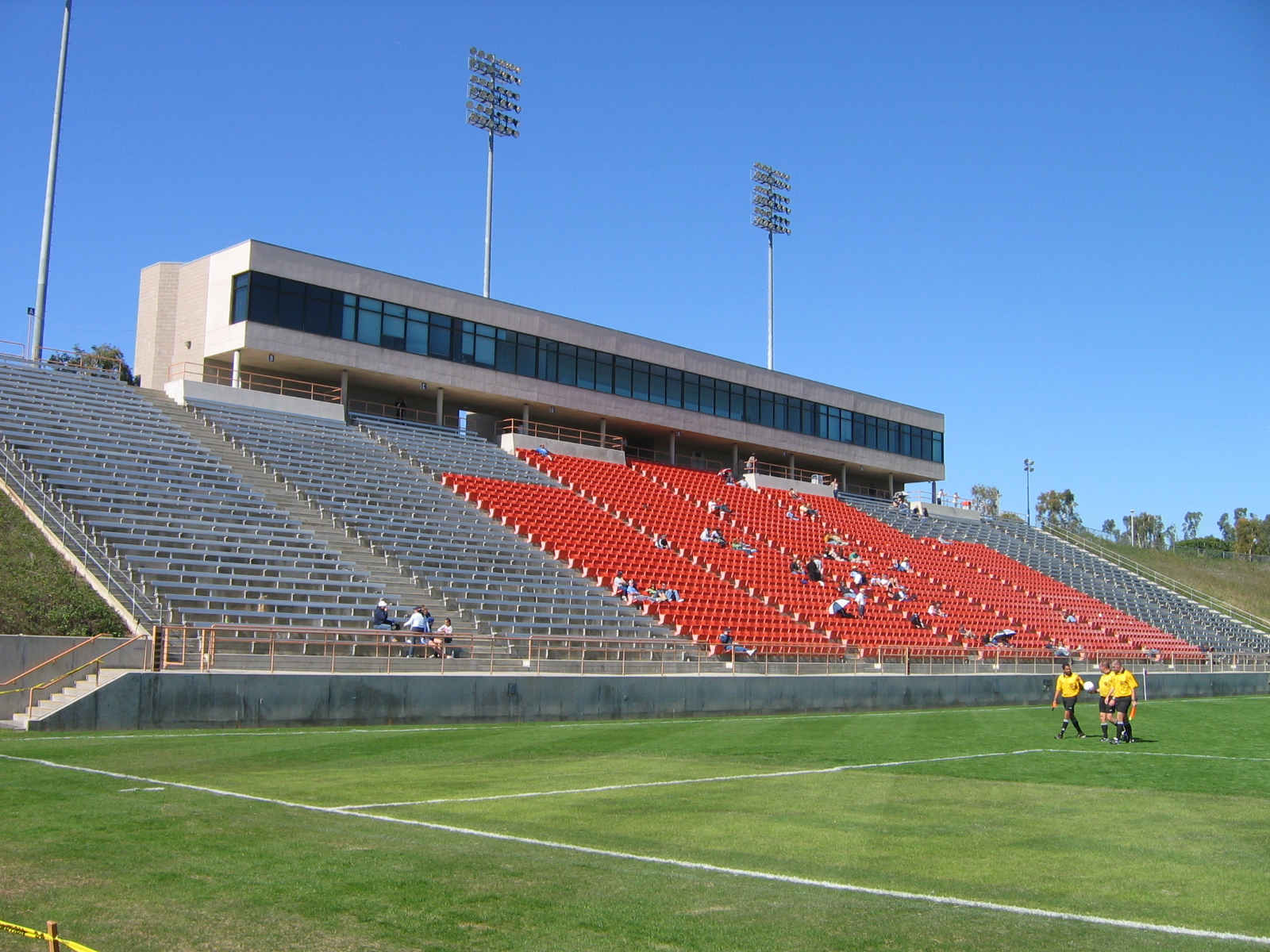
Home grandstand, Spring 2007

Titan Stadium was one of the hosts of the Los Angeles Salsa, a former professional soccer team in the now defunct American Professional Soccer League between 1993 and 1994. The Los Angeles Galaxy used the field as their home ground during their run to the 2001 Lamar Hunt U.S. Open Cup. In addition to professional soccer, NCAA Tournament games were also hosted in 1994, 1996, 1998, and 2005. The United States men's national soccer team has used Titan Stadium to host international soccer matches as well.

In addition to being a soccer stadium, Titan Stadium has been featured in television programs and commercials due to its proximity to Los Angeles. The UCLA Bruins have previously used the stadium as a practice field for their football program, once again bringing the sport to the CSUF Titans campus.

The Los Angeles Blues soccer team of USL Pro also played their home games at Titan Stadium.

Angel City FC of National Women's Soccer League played their home games at Titan Stadium during the 2022 NWSL Challenge Cup.

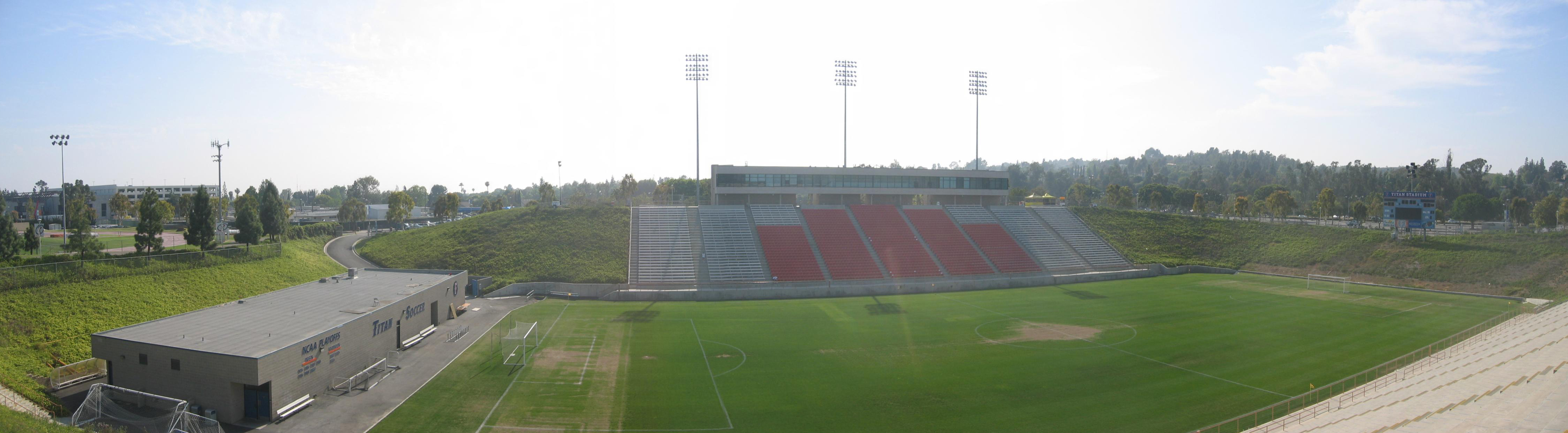
Panorama of Titan Stadium in 2007

== See also ==
- List of soccer stadiums in the United States
