= Los Angeles FC 2 =

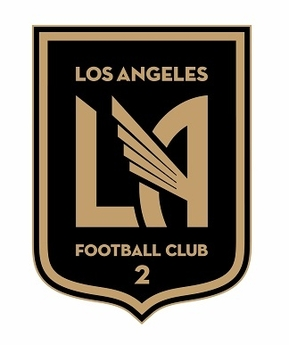
- Full name: Los Angeles FC 2
- Short name: LAFC2
- Founded: August 4, 2022; 4 years ago
- Stadium: Titan Stadium; Fullerton, California
- Capacity: 10,000
- Owner: Los Angeles FC
- Head coach: Fabian Sandoval
- League: MLS Next Pro
- 2025: 13th, Western Conference; Playoffs: Did not qualify
- Website: https://www.lafc.com/lafc2/
Home colors	Away colors

Los Angeles FC 2 is an American professional soccer team that is located in the Greater Los Angeles, California area. It is the reserve team of Los Angeles FC and participates in MLS Next Pro.

== History ==
On August 4, 2022, LAFC was named as one of 7 MLS-affiliated clubs that would field a team in the MLS Next Pro league beginning in the 2023 season. LAFC2 will play its home games at Titan Stadium on the campus of California State University, Fullerton.

== Players and staff ==
=== Current roster ===
As of 2026

No.	Pos.	Nation	Player
32	DF	USA	Travis Babineau
34	DF	USA	Guiliano Whitchurch
35	DF	USA	Luke Goodman
39	FW	USA	Nathan Mardaresco
40	FW	USA	Sebastian Nava
41	GK	JPN	Ethan Scally
44	DF	USA	Christian Díaz
46	MF	USA	DeCarlo Guerra
47	FW	CAN	Marius Aiyenero
48	MF	USA	Gavin Zambrano
49	FW	USA	Charlie Kosakoff
51	GK	MEX	Mark Gamez
55	DF	PAN	Érick Díaz (on loan from Tauro FC)
56	MF	USA	Eddie Villeda
62	DF	USA	Josh Santiago
66	MF	USA	Bryan Moyado
72	DF	ESA	Carlos Díaz
78	MF	MEX	Lisandro Torres
81	DF	USA	Ernesto Rodriguez
83	DF	USA	Skylar Kaplan
90	FW	CRO	Tommy Mihalić
—	FW	USA	Felix Gomez

Signed to first team contract with Los Angeles FC
Los Angeles FC Academy player.

=== Staff ===
Coaching Staff
Head Coach	Fabian Sandoval
Assistant Coach / Goalkeeping Coach	Claine Plummer
Assistant Coach	Alejandro Guido

== Team records ==
=== Head coaches record ===
As of February 9, 2026

Name	Nationality	From	To	P	W	D	L	GF	GA	Win%
Enrique Duran	Spain	January 25, 2023	December 20, 2023	28	6	15	7	30	39	21.43
Junior Gonzalez	United States	February 6, 2024	December 23, 2025	56	21	10	25	115	98	37.50

== Honors ==
- MLS Next Pro Western Conference
  - Champions (Playoffs): 2026

== See also ==
- MLS Next Pro
